= Timeline of the Indonesian National Revolution =

Conflict between the Republic of Indonesia and the Dutch Empire (1945-1949)

This is the timeline of Indonesian National Revolution.

== 1945 ==
- early 1945: Small, mostly Dutch, commando units parachute into northern Sumatra.

=== August ===
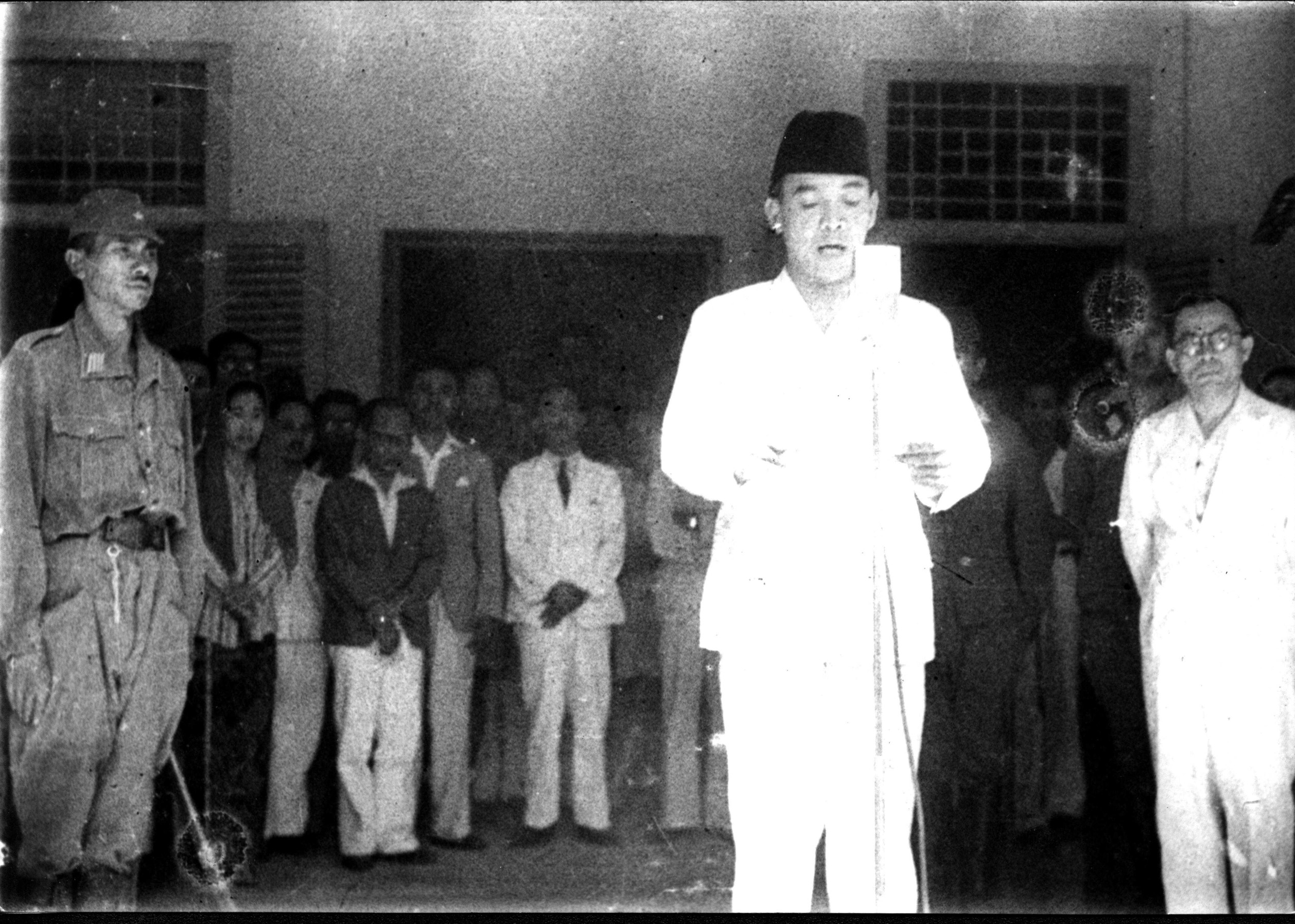
Sukarno declares the independence of Indonesia.

- 15 August: The Japanese surrender brings the fighting in World War II to an official close.
- 17 August: "Proclamation of Indonesian Independence", signed by Sukarno-Hatta.
- Tan Malaka, a former Indonesian Communist Party (PKI) leader, returns secretly from exile and reveals his identity in Jakarta and draws a large following.
- late August: A Republican government is established in Jakarta and a provisional constitution is adopted. Central Indonesian National Committee (KNIP) established.
- 17 to 25 August: The Japanese in Java and Sumatra disband the PETA/Giyūgun and Heiho, dismantling command structures and membership.
- 22 August: The Japanese announce their surrender publicly across Indonesia.
- August to September: Euphoria of revolution spreads across the country, while local Japanese commanders and their troops often abandon urban areas to avoid confrontation. Many discreetly allowed Indonesian youths to acquire arms. Republican youths take over infrastructure facilities in Jakarta, Yogyakarta, Surakarta, Malang and Bandung with little or no Japanese resistance. Mass pro-Republic rallies are held in Jakarta and Surabaya. Sukarno successfully convinces crowds to disperse without challenging the Japanese, thus further boosting his reputation as the only one able to prevent massive violence. Revolutionary spirit also emerges in literature and the arts.

=== September ===
- September: Brawls break out in Surabaya between Indonesian youths and newly freed Europeans.
- September: Australian forces accept the Japanese surrender in Japanese Navy area (with the exception of Bali and Lombok) bringing with them Dutch troops and administrators.
- early September: Following the August disbanding of the PETA/Giyūgun and Heiho, Republican armed forces begin to form from local groups of young men with charisma and/or arms.
- early September: Four rulers of the central Javanese principalities declare their support for the Republic.
- 3 to 11 September: Republican youths take over control of Jakarta railway stations, tram system and radio stations, encountering little Japanese resistance.
- 11 and 17 September: Mass pro-Republic rallies held in Surabaya.
- mid September: News of the proclamation of independence reaches all outer islands.
- 19 September: Pro-Republic rally of an estimated 200,000 people gathered by Tan Malaka is held in Jakarta in what is now known as Merdeka (Independence) Square. Fearing violent confrontations with the Japanese, Sukarno manages to convince the crowd to disperse. In Surabaya, the Yamato Hotel incident further fuels the flame of republicanism after a pro-Dutch gathering is countered by Republican pemuda for promoting pro-Dutch sentiments.
- mid-September to mid-October: Australian troops occupy the major cities of eastern Indonesia—in most cases before Republican administrations have been established—putting down demonstrations and arresting some pro-Republican officials. Pro-Republican rajas of southern Sulawesi decide against fighting the Australians and begrudgingly accept the return of the Dutch.
- late September: British troops, mostly Indian, reach Jakarta.
- late September: Major public infrastructure in Yogyakarta, Surakarta, Malang and Bandung is now controlled by Republican youths.
- late September: News of the proclamation of Indonesian independence has now spread to all outer islands.
- 9 November: First clash between Republican troops and Dutch forces in Banjarmasin.

=== October ===
- October: The Communist Party of Indonesia (PKI) is reconstituted after its 1920's disbanding.
- October: The beginnings of the so-called 'three regions affair' on the north coast of Java; it is a peasant social protest and attempts to avenge oppression under the Japanese occupation resulting in widespread violence. Actions are underway by both young Orthodox Muslim (abangan) activists and survivors of the 1926 PKI uprising against village headsmen.
- October: British troops, mostly Indian, arrive in Medan, Padang, Palembang, Semarang and Surabaya. To avoid confrontation, British commander Lieutenant General Sir Philip Christion, diverts soldiers of former Dutch East Indies army from Java to eastern Indonesia, where Dutch re-occupation was proceeding relatively smoothly, and there was considerable economic value.
- October: Tensions mount in Java and Sumatra where street fights develop between young Republicans on the one hand, and former Dutch prisoners, Dutch colonial troops (including Ambonese), Chinese, Indo-Europeans and Japanese on the other.
- October: The Japanese attempt to recover authority in Javan cities, which they had ceded in August and September, triggering the first stages of warfare.
- 3 October: Japanese Military Police (Kenpeitai) massacre Republican pemuda in Pekalongan.
- 3 October: After providing Indonesians ready access to arms, the pro-Republic Japanese commander in Surabaya, Vice-Admiral Shibata Yaichiro, surrenders to the first Allied representative, a Dutch navy captain.
- 5 October: The nucleus of the Indonesian National Armed Forces, the Public Security Armed Forces (Tentara Keamanan Rakyat), is formed on the basis of the units of the People's Security Department (Badan Keamanan Rakyat).
- 10 October: Japanese troops push Republicans out of Bandung and a week later hand the city over to the British.
- 1945, 14 October: Japanese troops begin to reclaim Semarang. Republicans retaliate by killing between 130 and 300 Japanese-held prisoners.
- 16 October: Sutan Sjahrir and Amir Sjarifuddin engineer a takeover within the KNIP amongst Republican deputies. On the same day Vice President Muhammad Hatta enacts Vice-Presidential Edict No.X giving it full legislative powers given concerns on the ground both of the Republican overall situation and those protesting on the attitude of Sukarno's cabinet as slow to act against the Dutch and to respond to people's needs, a Working Committee is created under the KNIP to exercise legislative duties in the event of recess of the main Committee
- late October to early November: Leaders of Nahdlatul Ulama and Masyumi declare that war in defence of the Indonesian fatherland is Holy War, an obligation laid upon all Muslims. The former stipulate their calls for armed war in a resolution of NU leaders. Muslims students begin to pour into Surabaya. The fiery Sutomo, (better known as 'Bung Tomo') uses the local radio to encourage an atmosphere of fanatical revolutionary enthusiasm throughout the city
- 20 October: Japanese have almost won Semarang but 500 Japanese and 2,000 Indonesians are killed. British troops arrive in Semarang.
- late October: British attempt to evacuate Eurasians and Europeans from volatile inland central Java. British detachments are sent into Ambarawa and Magelang to evacuate 10,000 detainees (mostly women and children). Air strikes are used to counter Republican resistance.
- 25 October: 6,000 British Indian troops arrive to evacuate Indonesian-held internees in Central Java. While initially welcomed, fights soon broke out due to Dutch contingent in relief force raising Indonesians' suspicion that British spearheading NICA who aim to recolonize Indonesia.
- 30 October: Sukarno and, Hatta and Amir Sjarifuddin are flown in by the British to negotiate and negotiate a ceasefire. Six hours later fighting breaks out again and British commander, Brigadier A.W.S. Mallaby is killed. In a subsequent lull in fighting, British reinforcements are brought in and the internees are evacuated.

=== November ===
- November: Amir Sjarifuddin followers form Pesindo (Pemuda Sosialis Indonesia, Indonesian Socialist Youth).
- November: So-called 'social revolutions' begin in the countryside; a competition between alternative elites and Dutch-created vs new social structures. Includes the beginnings of the so-called 'three regions affair' on the north coast of Java; a peasant social protest and attempts to avenge oppression under the Japanese occupation, which result in widespread violence.
- November: Sutan Sjahrir publishes a pamphlet titled Perjuangan Kita ('Our Struggle') showing him to be committed to international socialist revolution, in this he stated his criticism of murders committed upon citizens of European and Chinese ancestry (later known as the Bersiap) by patriotic pemuda and mobs inspired by Japanese propaganda during the war period.
- November: The Constitution is suspended in practice, although officially it remains in place.
- 2 November: Sukarno steps into the central Java conflict to arrange a cease fire following British requests, but fighting resumes in mid-late November and the British withdraw to the coast.
- 3 November: Vice-president Hatta proclaims the right of the people to form political parties.
- 10 November: At dawn, following Mallaby's death the previous month, British troops begin a punitive sweep through Surabaya under the cover of naval and air bombardment, but meet fanatical resistance. The city is conquered in three days, but fighting continues for three weeks. At least 6,000 Indonesians die and thousands flee. 10 November is now commemorated in Indonesia as Heroes’ Day.
- 11 November: Division commanders elect Sudirman as commander-in-chief of the young revolutionary armed forces, Oerip Soemohardjo was appointed chief of staff.
- 11 November: The cabinet is made responsible to the KNIP rather than to the president.
- 14 November: A new cabinet is formed; Sjahrir becomes Prime Minister and Minister for Foreign Affairs and the Interior.
- end November: Regents of Brebes, Tegal and Pemalang are replaced by supporters of this 'social revolution'.

=== December ===
- 1945, 12 November – Resident of Pekalongan is overthrown by 'social revolutionaries' and replaced with a former secret PKI member and underground leader. In retaliation, local Republican army units and 'pemuda' sweep through the three regencies arresting 1,000 supporters of the 'social revolution', which end in defeat.
- December: Amir's followers merge with those of Sjahrir's to form the Partai Sosialis ('Socialist Party').
- December 16: Battle of Ambarawa: Republican militias and regular army servicemen defeat remnants of an Allied Anglo-Dutch expedition to take over Ambarawa and the city of Semarang from Republicans thru military means, this would be later be marked as Indonesian Army Day.
- mid December – Allies evacuate Japanese troops from Aceh. Civil war then breaks out between the Achenese nobility and the ulama, who are Republican.
- December to March 1946 – Leading uleebalangs of Aceh and their families are imprisoned or killed.

== 1946 ==
- January: Tan Malaka forms the Persatuan Perjuangan (Struggle Front) that aims to create unity among the organisations that exist to achieve full independence for Indonesia and reject diplomacy before the recognition of sovereignty by the Dutch.
- February: The Republican capital is moved to Yogyakarta following the Dutch occupation of Jakarta.
- February: Communist Party members clash with Republican army units.
- March: In east Sumatra, Bataks and Javanese plantation migrants led by leftists attack the Malay, Simalungun Batak and Karo Batak rajas. Arrest and robbery leads to slaughter and hundreds of eastern Sumatran aristocrats die, including poet Amir Hamzah.
- 23–24 March: In what is known as the Bandung Sea of Fire, Republicans burn Bandung's southern wards while patriotic militias flee after refusing British demands for surrender.
- April: Leaders of the Eastern Sumatran social revolution are arrested or go into hiding but the authority of the rajas is irrevocably weakened.
- April–May: 300 people are killed in Tapanuli (North Sumatra) in fighting between Toba Bataks and Karo Bataks, an ethnic conflict influenced by the Christianity among the Toba and Islam among the Karo.
- 27 June: Opposition forces feel that '100 percent independence' is betrayed by a speech made by Hatta in Yogyakarta that reveals the limited nature of the government's negotiating position. Prime Minister Sjahrir is subsequently arrested by local army units hoping to reduce Republic leadership. Sukarno declares martial law and demands Sjahrir's release.
- 30 June: In a radio address, Sukarno declares that Sjahrir's arrest has endangered the unity of the nation, which shakes the confidence of the opposition; Sjahrir is released that same night.
- 3 July: A Republican army delegation is sent to Yogyakarta to demand Sukarno sack the Cabinet and put Sudirman in charge of security affairs. The delegation, however, is arrested along with about one hundred opposition figures including Yamin.
- July: At a Dutch-organised conference at Maliano (southern Sulawesi), thirty-nine Indonesian representatives of the rajas, Christians and several ethnic groups of Kalimantan and eastern Indonesia support the idea of a federal state and some form of continuing Dutch connection. The Dutch are surprised at the Indonesian request for some genuine autonomy. States of Kalimantan and for East Indonesia are planned.
- October: Following negotiations from the previous year, ceasefires in Java and Sumatra are agreed upon by the Dutch and the Republic.
- 12 November: The Linggadjati Agreement sees the Netherlands recognise the Republic as the 'de facto' authority in Java, Madura and Sumatra, and both sides agreeing to co-operate to establish a federal 'United States of Indonesia' by 1 January 1949; the Republic will be one of the states, the Dutch monarch will be the symbolic head of a Dutch-Indonesian union of sovereign states. The agreement does not last; compromises accepted by both parties provoke bitter political backlashes from both within the Republic and the Netherlands.
- November: The Dutch federalist structure in Sulawesi is threatened by Republican youths returning from Java where they had received military training.
- 14 December: The extra-parliamentary action group Nationaal Comité Handhaving Rijkseenheid is founded in the Netherlands by former Prime Minister Pieter Sjoerds Gerbrandy, channeling Dutch dissatisfaction with the Linggadjati Agreement.
- December: The Dutch respond to the Republican pemuda threat in southern Sulawesi with troops led by Captain Raymond 'Turk' Westerling that use arbitrary terror techniques. These techniques are emulated by other anti-Republican forces. Over three months at least 3,000 Indonesians are thought to have been killed, and Republican youth forces are decimated.
- December: The State of East Indonesia (Negara Indonesia Timur) is created at a conference in Denpasar Bali. Republican ideals are still influential; 'Indonesia Raya' is adopted as the national anthem, which is also used by the Republic, and a pro-Republic Bugis is almost elected president. Sjahrir protests at the unilateral creation of the state are ineffectual. All of Kalimantan cannot be incorporated as one state as the south and east coasts are too pro-Republican.
- December: To improve chances of KNIP-ratification of the 'Linggatjati Agreement', the KNIP is increased from 200 to 514 deputies by packing it with pro-government figures from the left wing parties, which form an opposition coalition against Republican majority.

== 1947 ==
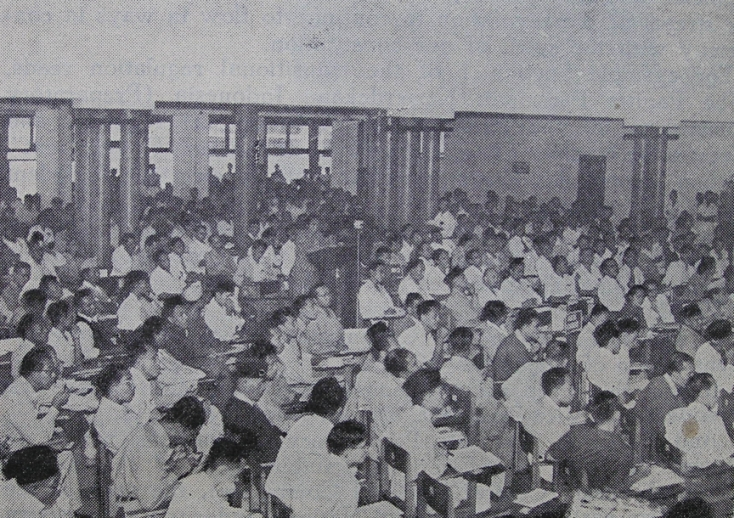
The historic meeting of the KNIP in Malang, East Java to decide Indonesia's response to the Linggadjati Agreement

- February: The pro-Republic Datu of Supa is killed by Westerling’s troops.
- February: The 'Linggadjati Agreement' finally ratified by the KNIP after Hatta and Sukarno threaten to resign if it is not accepted.
- June: Amir Sjarifuddin and other leftists in the KNIP withdraw support for Sjahrir's prime ministership. Sjahrir would go abroad to represent the Republic at the UN.
- July: Amir Sjarifuddin becomes Prime Minister of the Republic.
- May: A separate state of West Kalimantan is established under Sultan Abdul Hamid II of Pontianak. Sjahrir protests at the unilateral creation of the state are ineffectual.
- May: The Dutch decide that they must attack the Republic directly, believing they can conquer Republican-held cities within two weeks, and all Republican territory within 6 months.
- 20 July: At midnight, the Dutch launch a major military offensive, which they refer to as a Police Action. Major columns swept out from Jakarta and Bandung to occupy West Java and from Surabaya to occupy Madura and the Eastern Salient. Smaller troop movements secure the Semarang area. The Dutch thus gain control of all deep-water ports in Java, and in Sumatra control is secured over plantations around Medan, oil and coal installations around Palembang and the Padang area. Republican forces retreat amidst confusion destroying what they can, and carrying out last minute acts of revenge; ethnic Chinese in West Java and imprisoned aristocrats in East Sumatra are murdered. The Dutch originally intend to carry on to Yogyakarta to install a more amendable Republican Government. American and British protests at the military action, however, stop the Dutch from complete conquest of the Republic. Australian and Indian, and eventually American representation in the United Nations raise the profile of the independence cause.
- 4 August: The Dutch and Sukarno order a UN-demanded ceasefire
- August: The UN allows Sjahrir to address it, but does not allow representatives from Dutch-held areas.
- August: The Dutch continue mopping-up actions operations within their advance points where numerous Republican fighters remain, including the Siliwangi Division in West Java.
- September: The Dutch create the State of South Sumatra.
- October: The UN Good Offices Committee with American, Australian and Belgian representatives is established to assist Dutch-Republican negotiations for a new ceasefire.
- November: The Dutch create the State of East Java.
- December: The Dutch create the State of East Sumatra.

== 1948 ==
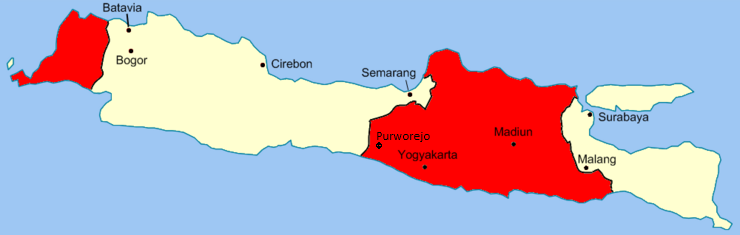
Map of Java showing the Van Mook Line after the Renville Agreement.

- January: A new agreement is reached between the Dutch and the Republic aboard the American ship USS Renville moored in Jakarta Bay and used as a neutral location. The agreement recognises the so-called 'van Mook line', an artificial line that links the most advanced Dutch-controlled areas, even though many Republican areas remain within this new area.
- January: PNI and Masyumi members of Cabinet resign over terms of the 'Renville Agreement'.
- 23 January: Amir Sjarifuddin resigns as prime minister. Sukarno appoints Hatta to head an emergency 'presidential cabinet' directly responsible to the President and not the KNIP. The new cabinet consists mainly of PNI, Masyumi and non-party members; Amir and Left Wing subsequently in opposition.
- February: Sjahrir's followers create the Socialist Party of Indonesia (Partai Sosialis Indonesia) giving their support to Hatta's government.
- February: The Dutch create the states of Madura and Pasundan (West Java) .
- February: A left-wing coalition renames itself the People's Democratic Front ('Front Demokrasi Rakyat') and denounces the 'Renville Agreement', which Amir's government had itself negotiated.
- February: In accordance with the 'Renville Agreement', Colonel Nasution leads the 22,000 men of the Siliwangi Division out of Dutch-held West Java into Republican Central Java with important consequences for both regions.
- March: Van Mook announces creation of a provisional government for a federal Indonesia with himself as president.
- May: A People's Democratic Front organised strike at a state textiles factory in Delanggu, Central Java begins. The strike is not, however, a matter of class divisions, but communal division, with the 'abangan' (nominal Muslims) supported by the Front, pitted against the 'santri' (strict Muslims) supported by Indonesian Hizbullah units. The strike is settled in July on terms favourable to the strikers, but, Republic politics are now increasingly entangled and run along the Javanese communal tensions manifested in the strike.
- May: Interpreting the Siliwangi Division's departure from West Java as a Republican abandonment of the region, Kartosuwirjo a Javanese mystic Masyumi-connected leader of Hizbullah guerrillas, launches a rebellion against the Republic, whilst continuing to fight the Dutch in West Java. He proclaims himself imam ('head') of a new state called Negara Islam Indonesia ('Indonesia Islamic State'), or more commonly known as Darul Islam. The Republic can only ignore the rival group until Kartosuwirjo's capture and execution in 1962.
- July: The Dutch establish a Federal Consultative Assembly (Bijeenkomst voor Federale Overleg) consisting of leaders of the fifteen Dutch-created states. There is now, however, significant pro-Republican support amongst the states’ native elite and little support for federalism among the population.
- August: Civil war threatens to break out after episodes of kidnappings, murders and armed conflict between factions of the Republican army as a consequence of a military rationalisation process aimed at a smaller more professional force. Republican Central Java is awash with political manoeuvring, military politics and communal tensions, while Dutch forces surround it to the west, north and east.
- 11 August 1948: Musso, the 1920s leader of the PKI, arrives in Yogyakarta from the Soviet Union. Amir and the leadership of the People's Democratic Front accept his authority, with Amir admitting membership of the underground PKI since 1935. Adhering to Musso's Stalinist thinking of a single party of the working class, the major leftist parties in the Front dissolve themselves into the PKI.
- August and September: PKI encourages demonstrations and industrial action by workers and peasants. Peasants were encouraged to take over landlords’ fields in the Surakarta and other areas.
- 1 September: A new PKI politburo is formed.
- September: Tan Malaka is released by the Republican Government in attempt to divert leftist supporters from the PKI.
- 17 September: Following the outbreak of open warfare in Surakarta between pro-PKI and pro-Government forces, the Siliwangi Division drives PKI supporters out of the city. Pro-PKI supporters withdraw to Madiun.
- 18 September: PKI supporters take over strategic points in the Madiun area, kill pro-government officers, and announce over radio the formation of a new National Front government. Caught off guard by the premature coup attempt, Musso, Amir and other PKI leaders travel to Madiun to take charge.
- 19 September: About 200 pro-PKI and other leftist leaders remaining in Yogyakarta are arrested. Sukarno denounces the Madiun rebels over the radio and calls upon Indonesians to rally to himself and Hatta rather than to Musso and his plans for a Soviet-style government. Musso replies on radio that he will fight to the finish. The People's Democratic Front in Banten and Sumatra announce they have nothing to do with the rebellion.
- late September: Pro-government forces, led by the Siliwangi Division, march on Madiun where there are an estimated 5,000-10,000 pro-PKI soldiers. As the rebels retreat they kill Masyumi and PNI leaders and officials, and in the villages killings take place along santri-abangan lines.
- 30 September: The rebels abandon Madiun and are pursued by pro-government troops through the countryside. Aidit and Lukman flee Indonesia for China and Vietnam.
- October: The 'national Communists' who had followed Tan Malaka's thinking and opposed the PKI rebellion form the Partai Murba ('Proletarian Party') becoming the main leftist group among the revolutionaries.
- 31 October: Musso is killed trying to escape from custody.
- 1 December: Amir and 300 rebel soldiers are captured by Siliwangi troops. Some 35,000 people are later arrested. It is thought perhaps 8,000 people were killed in the affair. Later in Surakarta, santri peasants turn on and killed abangan PKI supporters.
- 18 December: The Dutch launch a second major military offensive, the second 'police action'.
- 19 December: The Dutch occupy Yogyakarta city. The Republican government is captured, reportedly intentionally, including Sukarno, Hatta', Agus Salim, and Sjahrir. Republican forces withdraw to the countryside beginning full-scale guerrilla war on either side of the van Mook line. The army kill Amir and fifty other leftist prisoners as it withdraws from Yogyakarta that evening, rather than risk their later release.
- 22 December: International outrage leads to suspension of United States aid funds to the Netherlands.
- 22 December: With Nasution in effective control of army due to Sudirman's deteriorating health, he proclaims a military government for Java.
- 1 December: In Java, the Dutch accept a UN call for a ceasefire but guerrilla fighting continues.

== 1949 ==
The United States of Indonesia

- January: Sri Sultan Hamengkubuwana IX resigns as head of the Yogyakarta district after refusing Dutch attempts at persuading him to become leader of a new Javanese state. His court becomes a primary communication channel between the city and Republican units in the countryside.
- January: Cabinets of the Dutch controlled states of East Indonesian and Pasudan resign in protest at the 'police action'.
- 5 January: In Sumatra, the Dutch accept a UN call for a ceasefire but guerrilla fighting continues.
- late January: The UN Security Council demands the release of the Republican cabinet, the establishment of an interim government, and full transfer of sovereignty to Indonesia by 1 July 1950. The United States government publicly condemns the Netherlands and threatens to cut off vital Marshall Plan reconstruction aid.
- 21 February: In a clash with another Republic group, Tan Malaka and his army unit are defeated; Tan Malaka is captured and executed.
- 1 March: Lieutenant-Colonel Soeharto leads Republican forces in capturing Yogyakarta for six hours in what is known as the General Offensive of 1 March 1949. While the Dutch recover the city later, they are weakened at all fronts by the offensive.
- April: The Dutch accept they must relinquish their claims on Indonesia but insist on preliminary talks with the Republican government.
- 7 May: In the Roem–Van Roijen Agreement, the Dutch and Indonesia agree that Sukarno and Hatta will order a ceasefire upon their release and return to Yogyakarta, that the Dutch will accept the Republic at a round table conference, and that they will create no more federal states.
- 17 May: Kalimantan Proclamation declared by Hasan Basry and Republican troops in South & Central Kalimantan.
- May to June: The Dutch evacuate their citizens from Yogyakarta.
- 6 July: The Republican government is returned to Yogyakarta although the army is initially reluctant to accept the authority of the civilians it believes deserted the Republic. The army expresses support for the civilian administration when Suharto threatens to resign.
- July: A conference is held in Yogyakarta, and agrees that the Republican army will form the basis of the unified armed forces in a new 'Republic of the United States of Indonesia' (RUSI), with Sukarno and Hatta President and vice-president respectively.
- 1 August: A ceasefire is announced to take effect on 11 August in Java and 15 August in Sumatra. Following a ceasefire, Hamengkubuwana IX acts as Coordinator of Security and overseas a gradual transfer of military authority from Dutch troops and Indonesian irregulars, to Republic regular troops. Clashes break out and end in South Sulawesi, East Sumatra, South Kalimantan and West Java where local irregular troops resisted the transfer.
- 7-10 August: Surakarta is besieged in the final major Republican offensive in Central Java, the Siege of Surakarta, striking a final blow to Dutch military morale in Central Java. This is the final battle before the 11 August ceasefire takes effect. The siege by Republicans fails and Dutch forces relieve the city.
- 23 August to 2 November: The Dutch–Indonesian Round Table Conference is held in The Hague. Hatta dominates the Indonesian side of the negotiations, earning admiration from all sides. A loose union of the Netherlands and RUSI is agreed upon, the Netherlands-Indonesian Union, with the Dutch queen as a symbolic Head of State. Sukarno is named president with Hatta to as both Prime Minister and vice-president. Dutch investments in Indonesia are provided with various guarantees with further agreement on the need for further financial consultations. Indonesia accepts continued Netherlands sovereignty over Dutch New Guinea, and also accepts responsibility for £4.3 billion of Dutch East Indies debt.
- August to December: 12,000 Republican prisoners from Dutch jails are released.
- 27 December: The Netherlands formally transfers sovereignty over Indonesia, with the exception of Dutch New Guinea, to the RUSI government. In celebration, the national flag is hoisted at the Independence Palace in a public ceremony.

== 1950 ==
- 23 January 1950: Westerling and about 800 troops capture key points in Bandung, but is persuaded by the Dutch High Commissioner and the commander of the Dutch garrison still in Bandung to withdraw the same day.
- 24 January 1950: A Westerling plot to attack the Indonesian cabinet and assassinate several of its members is uncovered. His troops infiltrate Jakarta after leaving Bandung, but they are driven out.
- 27 January 1950: Parliament of Pasudan requests that state be dissolved and territory given to the Republic following the arrest of several Pasudan leaders suspected of involvement in the Westerling plot. The request is later granted.
- February: Westerling flees Indonesia in disguise.
- March: Much of the smaller states now dissolved into the Republic. Hatta cabinet makes hasty legislative arrangements to cater for the shift to unitarism.
- early April: Sultan Abdul Hamid II of Pontinak, head of the West Kalimantan state, is arrested as a major instigator in Westerling's plot. Authority of the state is taken over by the RUSI government, resulting in an increase of demands for merger with the Republic from residents and major business and social leaders.
- April: Colonial soldiers (mostly Ambonese), clash with Republican units in Makassar.
- 25 April: Dr Soumokil proclaims an independent Republic of South Maluku (RMS) in Ambon.
- May: A new East Indonesia state cabinet is formed with the intention of planning for full merger with the Republic.
- July to November: A tough campaign results in Republican troops crushing the RMS rebellion.
- 17 August 1950: On the fifth anniversary of the proclamation of Indonesian independence, the RUSI, the Republic as an element of it, and the remaining states of East Sumatra and East Indonesia are replaced by a new Republic of Indonesia with a unitary (but provisional) constitution. Jakarta is made the capital of this new state.

== See also ==
- Indonesian National Revolution
- History of Indonesia
