= Nationaal Comité Handhaving Rijkseenheid =

Action group

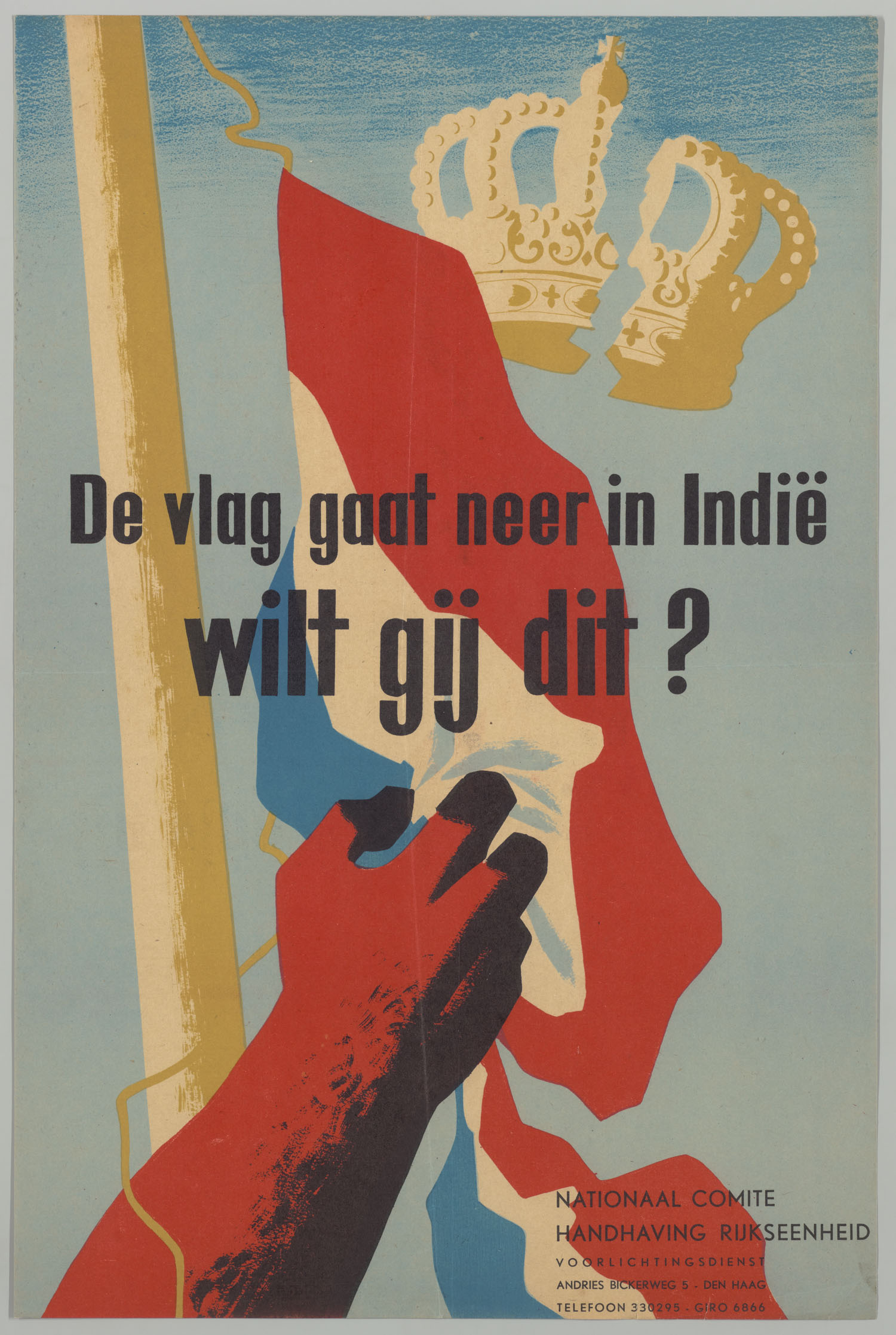
The flag is being lowered in the Indies, is this what you want?. Recruitment poster for the Committee, c. 1947. From the collection of the International Institute of Social History.

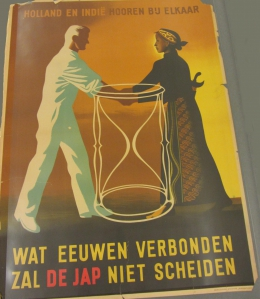
Holland and the Indies belong together. What centuries bound together, the Jap will not divorce. c. 1947 poster from the collection of the Royal Library of the Netherlands.

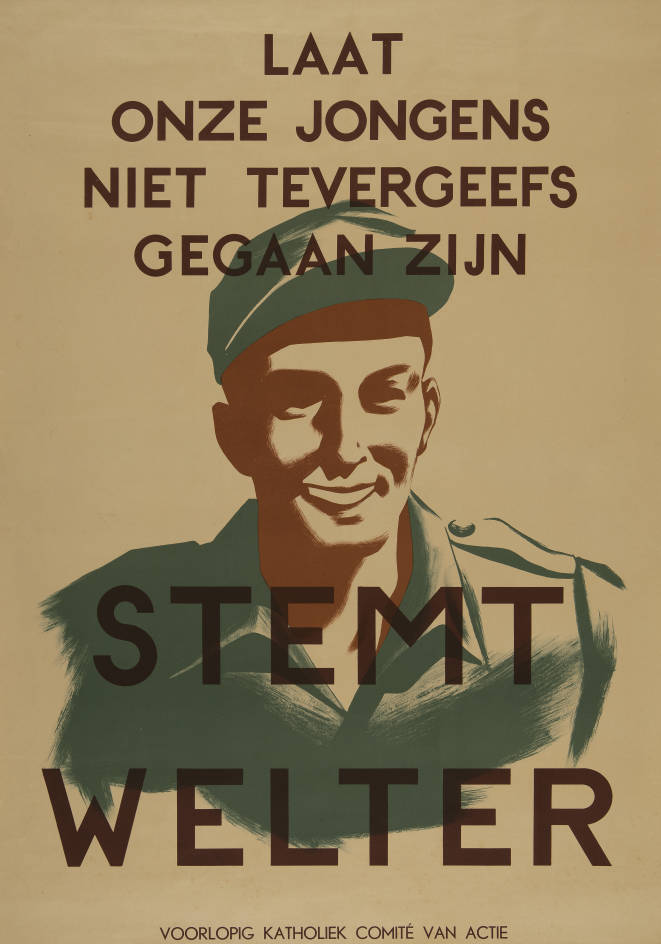
Don't let our boys have gone in vain. Election poster of the Welter List, Provisional Catholic Action Committee, for the 1948 Dutch general election.

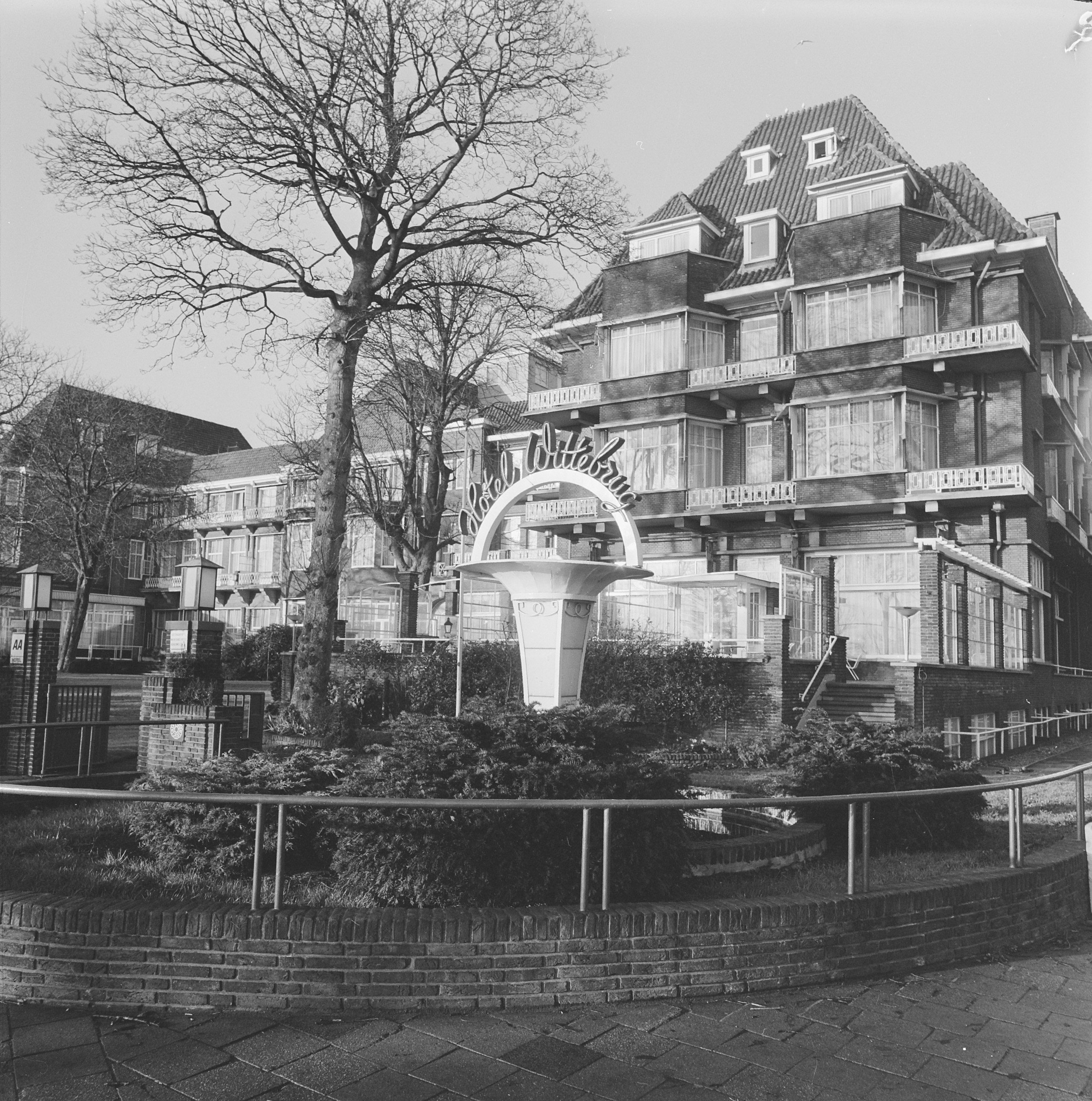
The Wittebrug Hotel in The Hague, where the Committee sometimes met weekly, close to Gerbrandy's home.

The Nationaal Comité Handhaving Rijkseenheid, fully the Nationaal Comité tot Handhaving der Rijkseenheid (English: National Committee for the Maintenance of Unity of the Kingdom), commonly shortened to Comité Rijkseenheid (English: Committee for Unity of the Kingdom) was an extra-parliamentary action group in the Netherlands that unsuccessfully appealed the 1946 Linggadjati Agreement between the Dutch government and the Republic of Indonesia regarding the exercise of authority over the Dutch East Indies. Enjoying wide support, in 1947 there were more than 250 local Committee meetings throughout the Netherlands, and by July 1947 it was able to collect 236,000 signatures for a petition.

== History ==
=== Background ===
On 2 December 1946, former Prime Minister Pieter Sjoerds Gerbrandy gave a fiery radio speech against the Linggadjati Agreement of 15 November 1946, in which he stated that the Netherlands would lose World War II after all through its own fault, if it ceded the Dutch East Indies (the use of the word 'Indonesia' was avoided). He argued that the Agreement betrayed the principles of Queen Wilhelmina's wartime radio speech from London on 7 December 1942, because although the East Indies were to receive their own status, they were also to remain within the Kingdom of the Netherlands. This broadcast received national acclaim and encouraged conservative liberals Willem Feuilletau de Bruyn and E.J. van Rees Vellinga to organize a signature campaign with a 'supplication' to the Queen under the motto "we demand the maintenance of unity of the Kingdom", which yielded 300,000 signatures within two weeks. Gerbrandy and many others saw the Republic of Indonesia as a legacy of the Japanese occupation of the Dutch East Indies, led by the collaborator Sukarno, who, among other things, would have no regard for the rights of Indonesian peoples other than the Javanese.

=== Founding and leadership ===
The Comité Rijkseenheid was founded on 14 December 1946 by Gerbrandy with a group of prominent, like-minded people. The name referred to the first article of the then-Constitution, regarding unity of the Kingdom. The Kingdom of the Netherlands consisted of four equal parts, namely the Netherlands, the Dutch East Indies, Suriname, and Curaçao and Dependencies (the Netherlands Antilles). Leadership of the Comité Rijkseenheid consisted of Gerbrandy as chairman of the daily and general management, former Minister of the Colonies Charles Welter as vice-chairman, and Willem Reyseger as secretary. Other notables were member of the Council of State Jan Willem Meyer Ranneft, former Minister of the Navy Johan Furstner, retired general Henri Winkelman, and former Minister of Justice and member of the Council of State Jan van Angeren. The political commission of the committee included Jan Schouten of the ARP, Hendrik Tilanus of the CHU, Dirk Stikker of the PvdV, and Pastor Pieter Zandt of the SGP. Pieter Oud, then a member of the Labour Party, also joined, but resigned within a month. It was not the intention of the committee to create a new political party, instead its members could exert pressure through their respective parties. Vice-chairman Welter used the East Indies as a spearhead for his Welter List in the 1948 Dutch general election. Professor and poet Carel Gerretson was not a leading member, but served as an advisor, orator at national meetings, and author of many articles on the Indies problem in magazines such as Nieuw Nederland, De Nieuwe Eeuw, Polemios, and Ons Vrije Nederland.

=== Activities ===
As early as 1946, the Committee collected two hundred thousand guilders from private individuals at meetings, but mainly from cultivation companies and textile magnates in the Indies, such as Gelderman and Van Heek. In a subsequent radio speech on both Dutch channels at the same time, on 2 January 1947, Gerbrandy attacked Sukarno, president of the Republic of Indonesia, and Van Mook, negotiator of the Linggadjati Agreement and lieutenant governor-general of the Dutch East Indies. He suggested military suppression of the Indonesian republic. In later radio addresses on 9 January, 8 February, 20 March, and 14 April 1947, he continued his criticism. The Committee also unsuccessfully addressed a 'supplication' to Queen Wilhelmina.

There was a pointless meeting with Prime Minister Beel, who was affronted by Gerbrandy's remark that the natives were being "doomed into damnation" by Dutch politicians, while they safeguarded the financial capital of the Indies' companies. The national organization with local and provincial chapters prospered with the distribution of circulaires and posters (with a broken crown) and in 1947 there were more than 250 local meetings and 150 local chapters were invited to the first national meeting. These local chapters had to be no larger than 20 to 25 members, broadly represent all denominations, and have a clearly defined personality among its members, with young enthusiastic people. Old films from the Dutch East Indies and new ones from the Army Information Service such as Brengers van Recht en Vrijheid (English: Bringers of Justice and Freedom) were shown. Orange-green ribbons were worn to symbolize the bond between the 'orange' Netherlands and the 'green' Indies.

Especially Gerbrandy, Gerretson, Welter, and Winkelman often orated at meetings around the country. In March 1947, the committee merged with the foundation Indië in nood... geen uur te verliezen (English: The Indies in distress... not an hour to lose) of H. van Swaay, an entrepreneur from The Hague, who had also collected funds from companies with interests in the Dutch East Indies. National meetings were held every two to three months. With a plan for home visits by the heads of districts and neighborhoods and colporteurs, 236,538 signatures were collected nationally (as of 30 July 1947) for a petition.

Meanwhile, the government complied with the Committee's demands in that, due to disappointing negotiations and lack of foreign currency exchange in Indonesia, it carried out Operation Product (21 July – 5 August 1947) with 100,000 soldiers; the first of the so-called Police Actions. The Indonesian capital of Yogyakarta, however, was not occupied. Gerbrandy blamed this on Van Mook (who along with general Spoor had actually been in favor of the occupation of Yogyakarta) and accused him of insubordination to the government. Subsequently, the government commissioner for radio, L.A. Kesper, who was also chairman of the advisory Radio Council, imposed a two-month radio gag order on Gerbrandy on 3 September 1947.

Requests from the Committee's leadership for audiences with Queen Wilhelmina or her temporary replacement Princess Juliana in September and November 1947 were not granted, at least not with Gerbrandy and Welter present because of their inflammatory statements. On 7 February 1948, Gerretson criticized the Queen for this, provoking Beel's deadly critical question as to whether the Committee was unfamiliar with the principle of ministerial responsibility in the Constitution.

In April 1948, the Committee unsuccessfully asked the House of Representatives to prosecute members of the government through the Supreme Court for violating the Constitution. On 27 May 1948, the House of Representatives passed a bill to amend the Constitution, which was approved after the elections of July 1948, which met Gerbrandy's legal argument about the unity of the Kingdom.

After the second 'police action', Operation Kraai (19 December 1948 – 5 January 1949), negotiations with the Republic of Indonesia led to lasting results: the Renville Agreement (17 January 1948), the Roem–Van Roijen Agreement (7 May 1949), the Dutch–Indonesian Round Table Conference (23 August – 2 November 1949) and finally the transfer of sovereignty on 27 December 1949. Gerbrandy remained in favor of independence for the people of the Maluku Islands and supported the Republic of South Maluku.

=== Dissolution ===
In January 1950, the foundation decided to dissolve. Acting liquidators were Gerbrandy, Welter, Meyer Ranneft, and Winkelman. In August 1952, the liquidation was completed and the foundation was dissolved.

== Archives ==
The archives left behind by the foundation are kept at the Nationaal Archief in The Hague and have been inventoried.

== See also ==
- Indonesian National Revolution
- 1947 Dutch coup plot
- Police Actions (Indonesia)
