= 1947 Dutch coup plot =

1947 Dutch coup attempt plan

The planned 1947 Dutch coup d'état (also known as the Gerbrandy plot) was a conspiracy by conservative and military circles centered around former Prime Minister Pieter Sjoerds Gerbrandy to overthrow the First Beel cabinet. Other key figures in the plot included resistance fighter Erik Hazelhoff Roelfzema and Admiral Conrad Helfrich. They aimed to block the implementation of the Linggadjati Agreement and prevent the independence of Indonesia. The objective was to install an extra-parliamentary emergency cabinet (Rijkskabinet) that would forcibly halt the decolonization process. The plan was never carried out, partly because Queen Wilhelmina withheld her support and the intelligence services were informed in time.

== Background ==
The primary motivation for the coup was deep dissatisfaction with the decolonization policy of the post-war Dutch government. Through the Linggadjati Agreement of November 1946, the Netherlands recognized the de facto authority of the Republic of Indonesia over Java, Madura, and Sumatra.

For conservative forces, led by wartime Prime Minister Gerbrandy, this agreement constituted a betrayal of the constitution and the unity of the Kingdom. Gerbrandy mobilized resistance through the National Committee for the Maintenance of Kingdom Unity (Dutch: Nationaal Comité Handhaving Rijkseenheid) and argued that it was both a right and a duty to overthrow the government if it "squandered" the Kingdom. This call for resistance resonated with the military leadership, where high-ranking officers such as Admiral Helfrich and General H.J. Kruls openly expressed their distrust of the cabinet.

== The plot ==
The conspiracy aimed for a takeover on Thursday, 24 April 1947, designated by the plotters as "Hour X". According to reports from the Centrale Veiligheidsdienst (CVD), Gerbrandy operated within the organization under the alias "Gerrit".

The plan involved the arrest of the entire cabinet and the formation of an authoritarian emergency government. Evidence of the specific division of roles was later discovered in the archives of François van 't Sant, a confidant of the royal family. These documents listed Gerbrandy as the intended Prime Minister, while Admiral Conrad Helfrich was designated as Minister of the Navy. Helfrich was considered the military authority behind the opposition, fearing that decolonization would permanently destroy the strategic position of the Dutch fleet.

The tactical leadership in The Hague lay with Erik Hazelhoff Roelfzema. As an adjutant to the Queen, he possessed an ideal cover to move within the center of power. A crucial component of the plan was the assassination of Labour Party (PvdA) chairman Koos Vorrink. Vorrink was viewed by the conspirators as the political architect of the decolonization policy, and his death was intended to serve as the signal for the coup to commence. On the evening of 24 April, two designated executors arrived at Vorrink's residence, but the assassination was aborted when he was found not to be home.

Within the military leadership, the position of General H.J. Kruls, the Chief of the General Staff, was complex. In his memoirs, Kruls later claimed that he had been approached by a "statesman" (Gerbrandy) regarding a coup but asserted that he had firmly rejected the idea, warning that the plotters would "be at the police station within 24 hours". However, other sources, including the Van 't Sant archives, suggest a more active involvement by Kruls during the early stages of the conspiracy.

Regarding the situation in the Dutch East Indies, Major General Simon de Waal was designated as a key figure. The plan took into account the loyalty of the incumbent Commander-in-Chief Simon Spoor to the government; De Waal was therefore poised to take command in the colony immediately after the coup to intensify military operations against the Indonesian Republic. The entire operation was ultimately called off after a police officer in The Hague, who had been approached for the position of Chief of Police under the new regime, warned the intelligence services (BVD and MID) that the plot had been compromised.

== Foil and aftermath ==
The planned coup was aborted at the last minute. A significant factor was the ambiguous stance of Queen Wilhelmina. Although she was kept informed of the dissatisfaction and the plans of the Gerbrandy group via her confidant François van 't Sant, she ultimately withheld her necessary support for an extra-parliamentary transfer of power. Without the monarch's legitimation, a new government under Gerbrandy would have remained unconstitutional, which proved an insurmountable obstacle for many moderate conspirators.

Additionally, the plot leaked to the security services. The threat was taken extremely seriously by the cabinet. For many military officers and conservative politicians, the immediate necessity for a coup evaporated when the government eventually proceeded with large-scale military action in July 1947, known as Operation Product. This operation on Java and Sumatra satisfied the demand for a tougher policy towards the Indonesian Republic through legal means.

The affair remained undisclosed for decades until December 1979, when the newspaper Het Vrije Volk revealed, based on secret documents, that major Dutch cities had been placed on high alert in April 1947 due to the threat of a coup. Following this publication, Member of Parliament Henk Waltmans asked Prime Minister Dries van Agt for clarification. Van Agt denied that the cabinet minutes of 1947 contained any indication of fear of a coup.

This denial was contradicted by documents found in the Amsterdam City Archives in the personal papers of Mayor Arnold Jan d'Ailly. These revealed that he had received confidential intelligence from ministers in 1947 regarding an impending power grab by the Gerbrandy circle. The indications were so concrete that D'Ailly had already drafted a proclamation to the population of Amsterdam to maintain order in the event the coup succeeded.

== Historiography ==
Historian Loe de Jong later wrote that Gerbrandy's plans would have merely created chaos and confusion without altering the outcome of the conflict with the Republic of Indonesia. While biographer Cees Fasseur characterized the plans as "daydreaming," more recent historians such as Sytze van der Zee argue, based on the archives of François van 't Sant, that the threat was regarded as genuine and acute by the sitting ministers.

In 2024, the theater group De Jonge Honden produced the play De Staatsgreep (The Coup), focusing on the radicalization of Erik Hazelhoff Roelfzema. The play highlights the moral tensions between colonial nostalgia and the reconstruction of post-war democracy.
