= Gerrit Jan van Heuven Goedhart =

Dutch politician and diplomat (1901–1956)

His Excellency Gerrit Jan van Heuven Goedhart
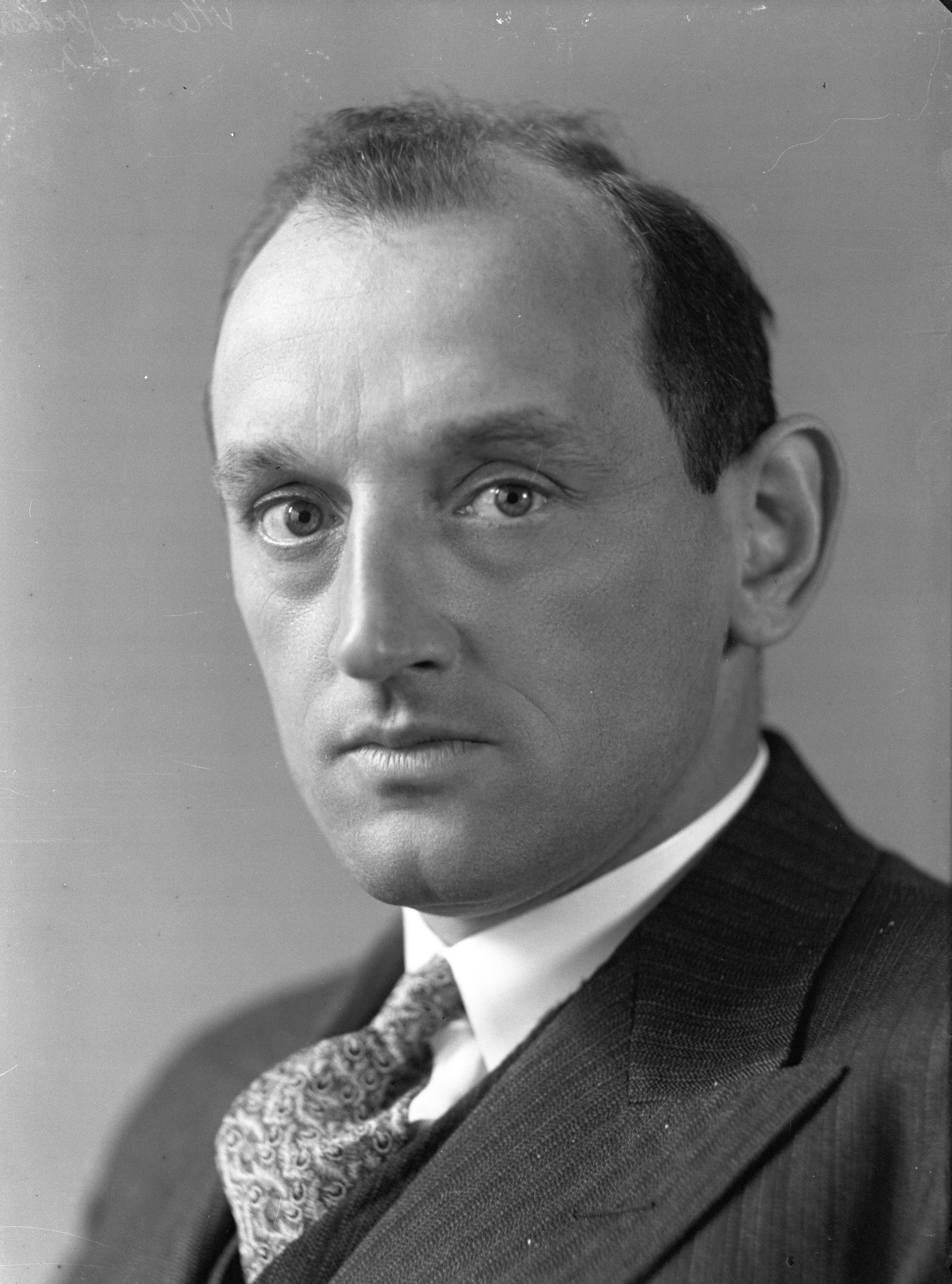
- Van Heuven Goedhart in 1939

United Nations High Commissioner for Refugees
- In office 1 January 1951 – 8 July 1956
- Secretary-General: Trygve Lie (1951–1952); Dag Hammarskjöld (1953–1956)
- Preceded by: Office established
- Succeeded by: August R. Lindt

Senator of the Netherlands
- In office 22 October 1947 – 1 January 1951

Minister of Justice
- In office 11 July 1944 – 23 February 1945
- Prime Minister: Pieter Sjoerds Gerbrandy
- Preceded by: Jan van Angeren
- Succeeded by: Pieter Sjoerds Gerbrandy

Personal details
- Born: Gerrit Jan Goedhart; 19 March 1901 Bussum, Netherlands
- Died: 8 July 1956 (aged 55) Geneva, Switzerland
- Party: Labour Party (from 1946)
- Other political affiliations: Independent Social Democrat (1944–1946)
- Spouses: Francis Becht (m. 1924; dissolved 1931) Erna Hauan (m. 1932)
- Children: Karin Sophie van Heuven Goedhart (1934–2013); Bergliot Halldis van Heuven Goedhart (born 1936) (second marriage)
- Education: Leiden University (Bachelor of Laws, Master of Laws, Doctor of Philosophy)
- Occupation: Politician · Diplomat · Jurist · Journalist · Editor · Author

Gerrit Jan van Heuven Goedhart (19 March 1901 – 8 July 1956) was a Dutch politician, diplomat and journalist. A member of the Labour Party (PvdA), he was Minister of Justice from 1944 to 1945 under Prime Minister Pieter Sjoerds Gerbrandy. He later served as the first United Nations High Commissioner for Refugees from 1951 until 1956.

== Biography ==
=== Early life ===
Van Heuven Goedhart was born on 19 March 1901 in Bussum, North Holland. His father, Gijsbert Willem Goedhart, was a Protestant vicar. His mother was Francina Dingena Helena van Heuven. Van Heuven Goedhart was initially called Goedhart, but in 1933 he received permission to add his mother's maiden name to his surname. Van Heuven Goedhart studied law at Leiden University and graduated in 1926. The year before, he had already become a reporter for newspaper De Telegraaf. On 1 January 1930, at the age of 28, he was promoted to editor in chief. He was fired on 1 June 1933 because he refused to publish an article that called the newly elected German leader Adolf Hitler "a great statesman". He became editor in chief of regional newspaper Utrechts Nieuwsblad, where he would stay in office until the German invasion of the Netherlands.

=== Politics ===
During World War II, Van Heuven Goedhart worked as a reporter and editor in chief for the illegal resistance newspaper Het Parool. In 1944 he fled to London, where he was appointed Minister of Justice in the government in exile.

After the World War II, Van Heuven Goedhart returned to Het Parool, where he once again become editor in chief. In 1947, he also became Senator for the Labour Party. In 1951, he gave up both occupations to become the first High Commissioner for Refugees of the United Nations. Under Van Heuven Goedhart, the UNHCR was awarded the 1954 Nobel Peace Prize.

Van Heuven Goedhart was also the first chairman of the "state committee for the coordination of government information" (Dutch: Staatscommissie over de coördinatie van de overheidsvoorlichting), the predecessor of the Netherlands Government Information Service (Dutch: Rijksvoorlichtingsdienst).

== Personal ==
Van Heuven Goedhart married Francis Becht (1899–1987) in 1924. The marriage was dissolved in 1931. In 1932, Van Heuven Goedhart married Norwegian Erna Hauan (1899–1991). Van Heuven Goedhart had two children from his second marriage, Karin Sophie and Bergliot Halldis. Van Heuven Goedhart died in Geneva on 8 July 1956, while being United Nations High Commissioner for Refugees.

== Decorations ==
Honours
| Ribbon bar | Honour | Country | Date | Comment |
| | Knight of the Order of the Netherlands Lion | Netherlands | 30 April 1949 | |
Awards
| Ribbon bar | Awards | Organization | Date | Comment |
| | Nansen Refugee Award | United Nations | 1956 | Posthumously |
| | Wateler Peace Prize | Carnegie Foundation | 1956 | Posthumously |

Political offices
| Preceded by Jan van Angeren | Minister of Justice; 1944–1945 | Succeeded by Pieter Sjoerds Gerbrandy |
Diplomatic posts
| Preceded by Office established | United Nations High; Commissioner for Refugees; 1951–1956 | Succeeded by August R. Lindt |
