= Pieter Sjoerds Gerbrandy =

34th Prime Minister of the Netherlands

His Excellency Pieter Sjoerds Gerbrandy
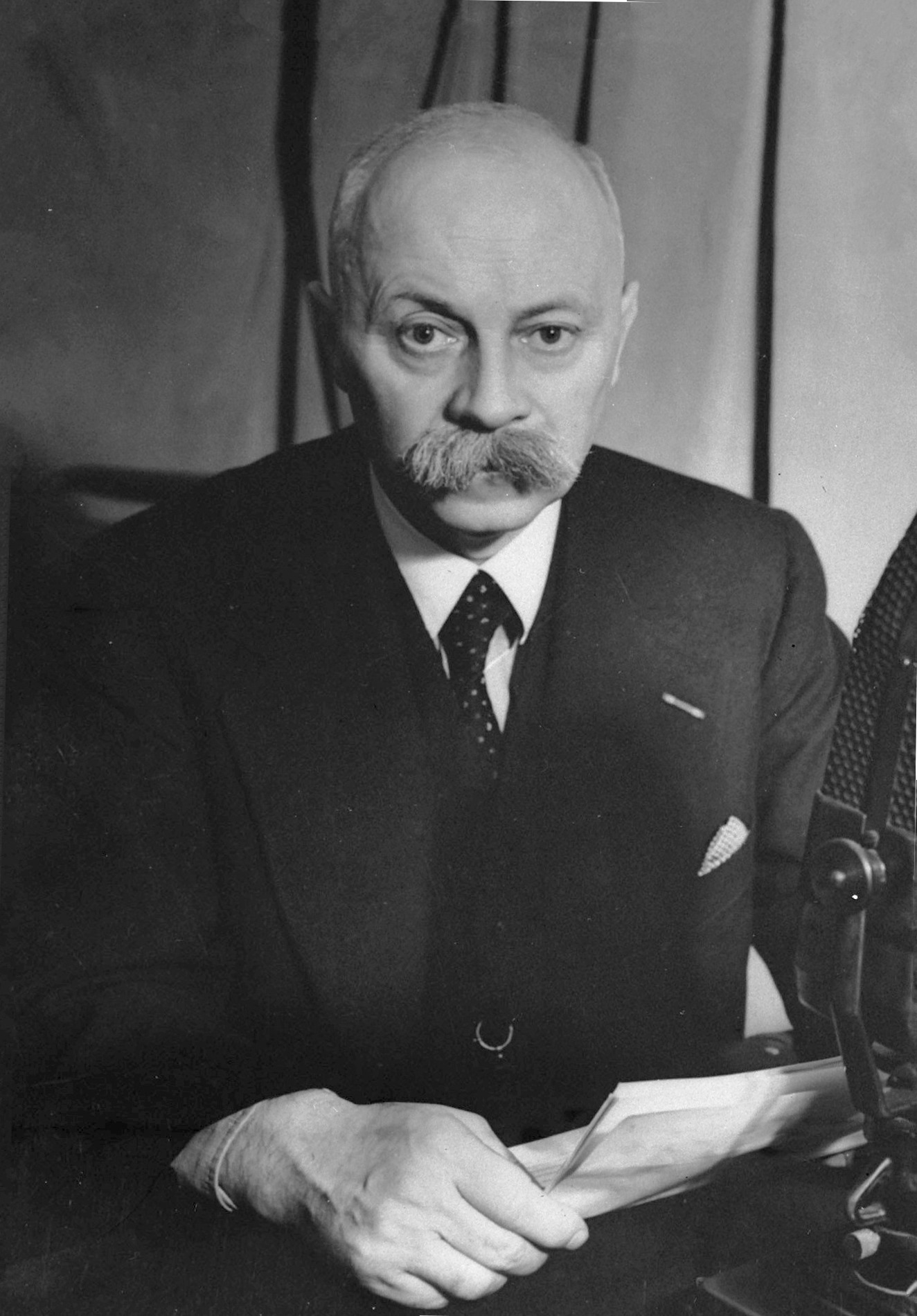
- Gerbrandy in 1941

Prime Minister of the Netherlands
- In office 3 September 1940 – 25 June 1945
- Monarch: Wilhelmina
- Deputy: Hendrik van Boeijen (de facto)
- Preceded by: Dirk Jan de Geer
- Succeeded by: Willem Schermerhorn

Member of the House of Representatives
- In office 23 October 1956 – 20 March 1959
- In office 27 July 1948 – 3 July 1956

Minister of Colonial Affairs
- In office 17 November 1941 – 21 May 1942
- Prime Minister: Himself
- Preceded by: Charles Welter
- Succeeded by: Hubertus van Mook

Minister of Justice
- In office 23 February 1945 – 25 June 1945
- Prime Minister: Himself
- Preceded by: Gerrit Jan van Heuven Goedhart
- Succeeded by: Hans Kolfschoten
- In office 10 August 1939 – 21 February 1942
- Prime Minister: Dirk Jan de Geer (1939–1940); Himself (1940–1942)
- Preceded by: Johan de Visser
- Succeeded by: Jan van Angeren

Personal details
- Born: Pieter Gerbrandij; 13 April 1885 Goënga, Netherlands
- Died: 7 September 1961 (aged 76) The Hague, Netherlands
- Party: Anti-Revolutionary Party
- Spouse: Hendrina Elisabeth Sikkel (m. 1911)
- Children: 2 sons and 1 daughter
- Education: Free University Amsterdam
- Pieter Sjoerds Gerbrandy's voice Pieter Sjoerds Gerbrandy in exile speaks to the Dutch people under Nazi occupation (Recorded 1945)

Pieter Sjoerds Gerbrandy (born Pieter Gerbrandij; 13 April 1885 – 7 September 1961) was a Dutch politician and jurist who served as Prime Minister of the Netherlands from 3 September 1940 until 25 June 1945. He oversaw the government-in-exile based in London under Queen Wilhelmina during the German occupation of the Netherlands. He was a member of the Anti-Revolutionary Party (ARP).

== Early life ==
Pieter Sjoerds Gerbrandy was born on 13 April 1885 in the village of Goënga, near Sneek, in the province of Friesland. He was an ethnic Frisian, and his name is styled in the traditional Frisian way: first name ("Pieter"), patronymic ("Sjoerds", meaning "son of Sjoerd"), family name (Gerbrandy). Incidentally, the name Gerbrandy is also a patronymic since his great-great-grandfather Jouke Gerbrens (1769–1840) took "Gerbrandy" as a family name on 30 December 1811.

Pieter applied to Vrije Universiteit Amsterdam in June 1904 and majored in law. He would obtain a doctorate in law in January 1911 and proceeded to work as a lawyer and prosecutor from 1911 to 1920.

== Early political career ==
Gerbrandy was a member of the Municipal Council of Sneek from April 1916 to January 1930, the Provincial Council of Friesland from July 1919 to August 1920 and the Provincial Executive of Friesland from August 1920 to January 1930.

From 1920 to 1930, he was a member of the Provincial Council of Friesland for the Anti-Revolutionary Party (ARP). He also served as Minister of Justice in 1939 against his party's wishes.

== World War II ==
The German victory at the Battle of the Netherlands in 1940 made the Dutch royal family and many leading politicians flee to London and form a government-in-exile. With Dirk Jan de Geer's resignation the same year, Queen Wilhelmina appointed Gerbrandy as prime minister of the Dutch government-in-exile. He also served as Minister of Justice and Minister of Colonial Affairs.

== Postwar ==
After the liberation of the southern Netherlands in 1945, Gerbrandy formed a new cabinet, but he resigned after the total liberation of the country. He opposed the government's Indonesian policy and from 1946 to 1950 chaired the National Committee for the Maintenance of the Kingdom's Unity, which opposed Indonesian independence and advocated for the Republic of South Maluku.

In 1947, Gerbrandy took part in a coup plot to prevent the implementation of the Linggadjati Agreement and Indonesian independence. The plot failed without support from Queen Wilhelmina.

In 1950, Gerbrandy published Indonesia, which offered an explanation of the history of the relationship between the Netherlands and the Dutch East Indies (now Indonesia) from the 1600s to 1948, which included "The Indies under Dutch rule", "The Rule of Law", "The Japanese Occupation", and "Chaos", with each section outlining Gerbrandy's observations.

In 1948, Gerbrandy returned as a member of the Dutch Parliament, but his hot temper alienated members of his party. In 1956, he was made member of a commission that investigated the affair surrounding Greet Hofmans. Three years later, Gerbrandy resigned as a Member of Parliament.

== Personal life ==
On 18 May 1911, Gerbrandy married Hendrina Elisabeth Sikkel (26 February 1886 – 4 May 1980). Pieter Sjoerds Gerbrandy died on 7 September 1961 in The Hague, at the age of 76.

== Decorations ==
Honours
Ribbon bar	Honour	Country	Date	Comment
	Knight Grand Cross of the Order of the Netherlands Lion	Netherlands	6 May 1946	Elevated from Knight (28 August 1930)
	Knight Grand Cross of the Order of Orange-Nassau	Netherlands	5 April 1955	
	Grand Cross of the Order of Adolphe of Nassau	Luxembourg		
	Honorary Knight Grand Cross of the Order of the British Empire	United Kingdom		

Honorific titles
Ribbon bar	Honour	Country	Date	Comment
	Minister of State	Netherlands	5 April 1955	Style of Excellency

Political offices
Preceded by Johan de Visser	Minister of Justice; 1939–1942; 1945	Succeeded by Jan van Angeren
Preceded by Gerrit Jan van Heuven Goedhart	Minister of Justice; 1939–1942; 1945	Succeeded by Hans Kolfschoten
Preceded by Dirk Jan de Geer	Prime Minister of the Netherlands; 1940–1945	Succeeded by Willem Schermerhorn
Preceded by Charles Welter	Minister of Colonial Affairs; 1941–1942	Succeeded by Hubertus van Mook
Preceded by Hendrik van Boeijen	Minister of General Affairs; 1945	Succeeded by Willem Schermerhorn
