= Central Indonesian National Committee =

Government body of independent Indonesia

Central Indonesian National Committee Komite Nasional Indonesia Pusat

Type
- Type: Unicameral

History
- Established: 29 August 1945
- Disbanded: 15 December 1949
- Preceded by: Preparatory Committee for Indonesian Independence
- Succeeded by: House of Representatives (United States of Indonesia)

Leadership
- Chairs: Kasman Singodimedjo (1945); Sutan Sjahrir (1945); Supeno (1945–1947); Assaat (1947–1949)

Structure
- Seats: 514 members (1947)
- Political groups: Left Wing Alliance (197): Socialist Party (35); Communist Party (35); Labour Party (35); Workers and Peasants (80); Christian Party (8); Catholic Party (4); Governance Alliance (105): Masyumi Party (60); National Party (45); Various allegiances (212): Various (212)

Meeting place
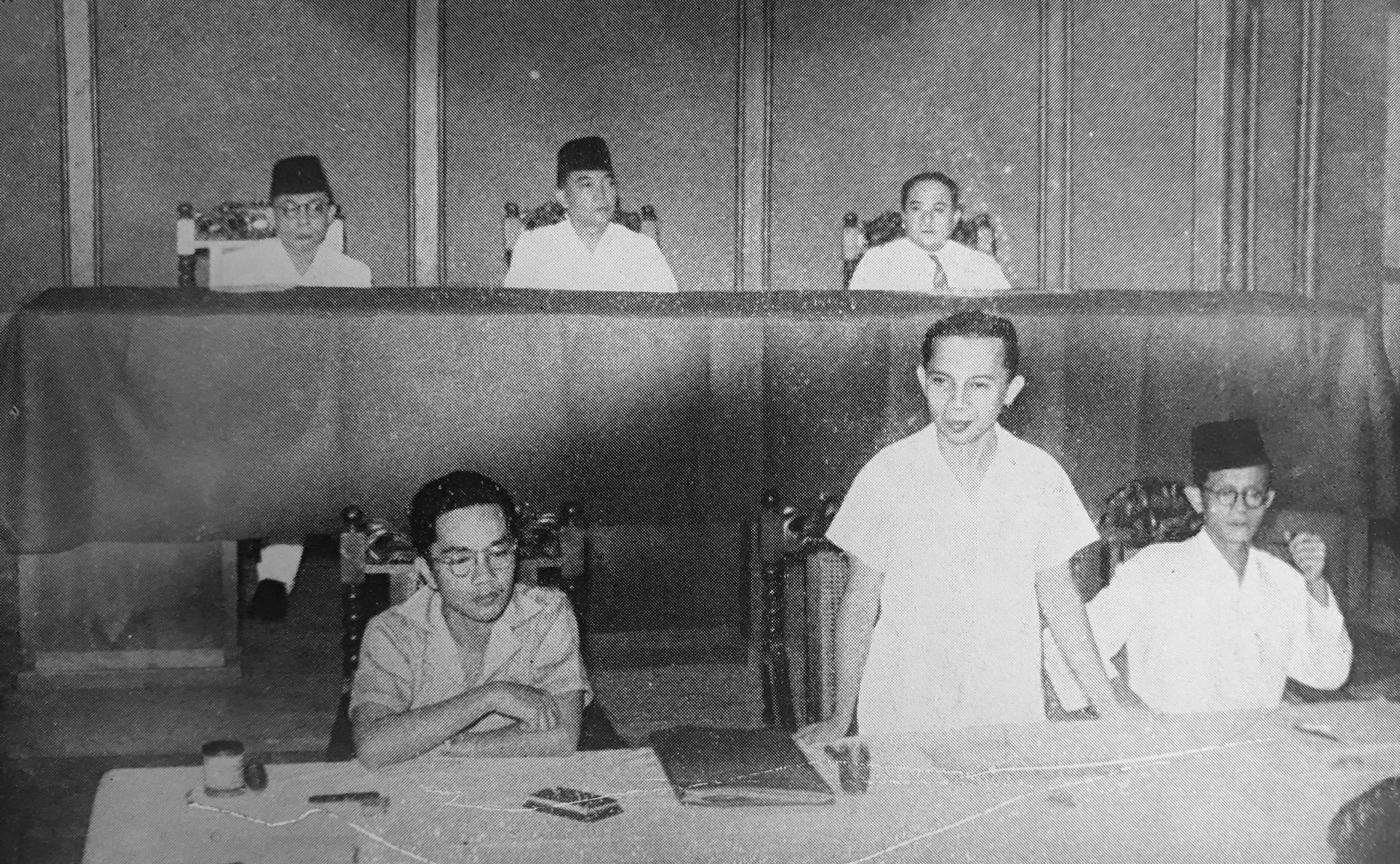
- Jakarta Art Building (first meeting place)

Constitution
- Constitution of Indonesia; Granted legislative power by the Vice-Presidential Edict No.X

The Central Indonesian National Committee (Indonesian: Komite Nasional Indonesia Pusat, KNIP), also known as the Central National Committee (Indonesian: Komite Nasional Pusat, KNP), was a body appointed to assist the president of the newly independent Indonesia. Originally purely advisory, it later gained assumed legislative functions. The Working Committee of the KNIP became part of the People's Representative Council when Indonesia became a unitary state in 1950.

== Pre-independence bodies ==
The Japanese invaded Indonesia in 1942. By 1943 the tide had turned against them, and in order to encourage support for the war effort, the Japanese appointed Indonesian advisors (Japanese: 參預, romanized: sanyo) to the administration and appointed nationalist leader Sukarno leader of a new Central Advisory Board (Japanese: 中央參議會, romanized: Chūō Sangi-kai) in Jakarta. In March 1945, the Japanese established the Investigating Committee for Preparatory Work for Independence (Indonesian: Badan Penyelidik Usaha Persiapan Kemerdekaan) or BPUPK, chaired by Radjiman Wediodiningrat, with Sukarno, Hatta and Thamrin among its members. This body drew up a constitution for an independent Indonesia over several weeks of meetings. At a session of the Committee on 1 June 1945, Sukarno laid down the principles of Pancasila, which would become the Indonesian national ideology.

On 7 August, the day after the atomic bombing of Hiroshima, the Preparatory Committee for Indonesian Independence (PPKI) was established. Sukarno was chairman, and Hatta vice-chairman.

== Establishment ==
On 17 August, Sukarno proclaimed the Independence of Indonesia. On 18 August, the PPKI accepted the constitution drawn up by the BPUPK as the provisional Constitution of Indonesia and decided that during a six-month transition period, the new republic would be governed according to the constitution by a president, assisted by a National Committee, who would establish the two chamber legislature mandated by the constitution. The upper chamber, the People's Consultative Assembly would then have six months to draw up a new constitution, leaving open the possibility that this would be an entirely new document free of the influence of the situation prevailing during the Second World War. The PPKI also named Sukarno as president and Hatta vice-president. The following day it appointed 12 government ministers and decreed that Indonesia was to be divided into eight provinces.

On 29 August, Sukarno dissolved the Preparatory Committee for Indonesian Independence and established the Central Indonesian National Committee (KNIP). Sukarno and Hatta appointed 135 members, including the membership of the PPKI to this new body. It included people representing areas outside Java, Islam, women and young people.

== The KNIP as legislature ==
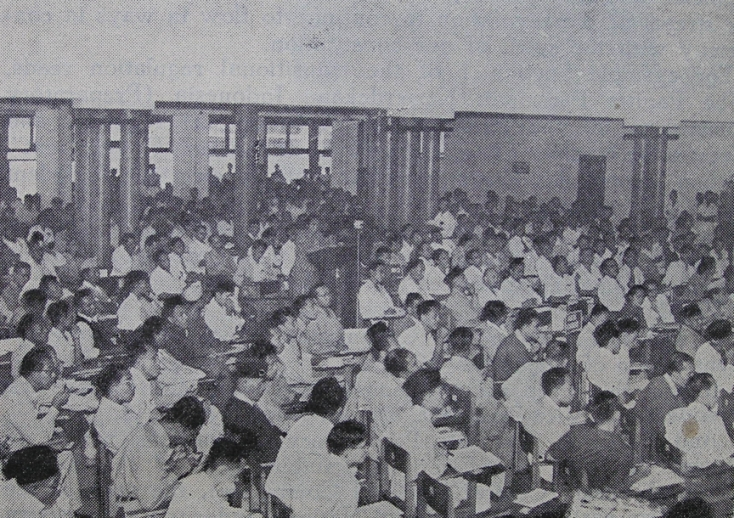
The meeting of the KNIP in Malang, East Java to decide Indonesia's response to the Linggadjati Agreement

Following pressure by individuals including Sutan Sjahrir and Amir Sjarifuddin for a less authoritarian system of government, on 16 October 1945, Vice-president Hatta issued Vice-Presidential Edict No.X transferring the powers the Constitution conferred on the People's Consultative Assembly and People's Representative Council from the president to the KNIP, making the government more parliamentary in nature. The day-to-day tasks of the KNIP would be carried out by a Working Committee. On 30 October, a decree allowed the establishment of political parties. Then on 11 November, Sukarno accepted the fact that ministers would now be responsible to parliament, rather than to him. Three days later, Sutan Syahrir became Indonesia's first prime minister.

In July 1946, the KNIP was reorganized by government decree. It now had 200 members. Of these, 110 were elected, 60 represented organizations and 30 were nominated by the president. Meanwhile, hopes that national elections would be held in January 1946 as planned began to fade.

At the end of 1946, there was "manipulation" of the KNIP membership when it appeared likely the body would reject the Linggadjati Agreement between the Dutch and the Indonesian republicans. In order to avoid this rejection, Sukarno more than doubled the size of the KNIP to 514 members. The decision to expand the KNIP was taken in late 1946, but became effective only in March 1947. The number of left-wing members increased sharply as they wanted the Dutch military action to be ended as quickly as possible. These changes severely damaged that the KNIP's image as representing public opinion.

Because of the ongoing armed struggle against the Dutch, it was not possible for the entire KNIP to meet regularly. Therefore, the KNIP acted as the upper house, the People's Consultative Assembly in the constitution, meeting only infrequently to discuss fundamental and pressing national issues, while the Working Committee continued to act as the day-to-day parliament.

== Membership ==
After the Linggadjati Agreement was signed between the Republic of Indonesia and the Dutch in November 1946, the left-wing parties, who supported the agreement, formed the Left Wing grouping, while parties opposing it formed the Republican Fortress. The proportion of seats held by the Left Wing increased dramatically following President Sukarno's appointments. The original and revised membership was as follows:

Affiliation	1946	1947
Socialist Party (PSI)	35	35
Communist Party of Indonesia (PKI)	2	35
Labour Party of Indonesia	6	35
Workers	-	40
Peasants	-	40
Parkindo	4	8
Catholic Party	2	4
Left Wing (Sayap Kiri)	49	197
Masjumi	35	60
Indonesian National Party (PNI)	45	45
Republican Fortress (Benteng Republik)	80	105
Sumatra	1	50
Kalimantan	4	8
Sulawesi	5	10
Moluccas	2	5
Lesser Sundas	2	5
Chinese	5	7
Arabs	2	3
Eurasian	1	3
Other categories	49	121
Various allegiances	71	212
TOTAL	200	514

== KNIP sessions ==
The KNIP held six sessions between 1945 and 1949 in various locations around Java.

Session	Dates	Location	Notes
I	29 August 1945	Former Schouwburg Weltevreden theater, Jakarta	Members inaugurated by Sukarno
II	16–17 October 1945	Hotel Binnenhof, Jakarta	
III	25–27 November 1945	Jl. Diponegoro, Jakarta	
IV	28 February – 3 March 1946	Solo, Central Java	
V	25 February – 6 March 1947	Societet Concordia building, Malang	Ratified the Linggadjati Agreement
VI	5–15 December 1949	Indonesian Red Cross building, Yogyakarta	

== Dissolution ==
Following the transfer of sovereignty to the United States of Indonesia (RIS), in December 1949, the state adopted a bicameral system. The KNIP met for the last time on 15 December 1949 to agree to the Republic of Indonesia joining the RIS. However, this state was short lived, and when Indonesia became a unitary state in August 1950, the Working Committee of the KNIP became part of the People's Representative Council.

== See also ==
- Timeline of the Indonesian National Revolution
