= Jan van Angeren =

Dutch politician (1894–1959)

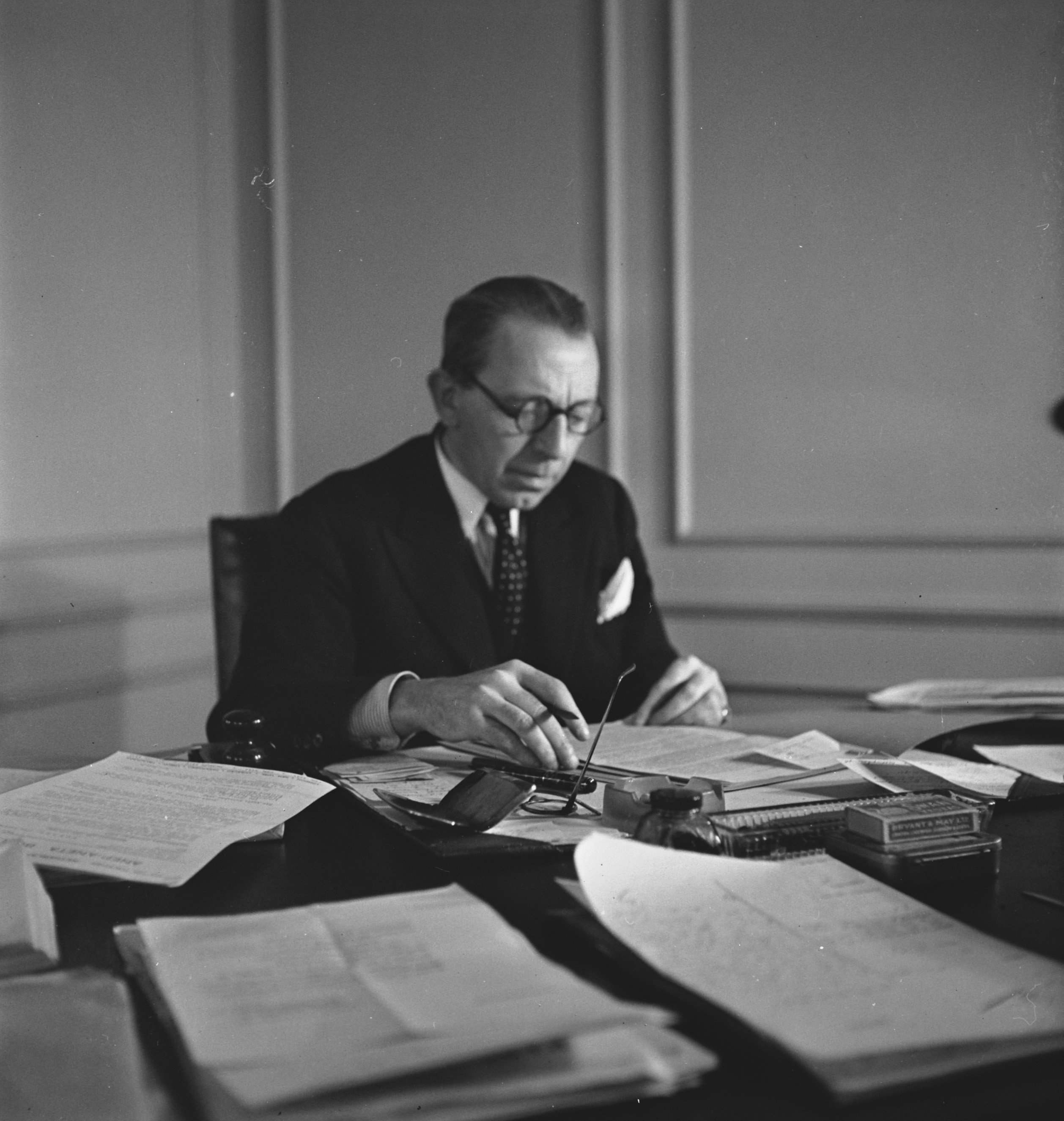
Jan van Angeren

Johannes Regnerus Maria van Angeren (9 May 1894 – 19 March 1959) was a Dutch politician. He was born in Utrecht and died in The Hague. He was a minister in the Dutch government-in-exile in London during the second World War.

== Biography ==
Van Angeren was a jurist and a public servant. In 1937, after a short departmental career, he became the first Roman Catholic secretary-general for Justice department. In his position as secretary-general he advocated tough action against Nazism, and he fled in May 1940 with his minister to England, where the Dutch established a government in exile. He later succeeded Gerbrandy as minister of Justice in London. Later in 1944, he clashed with Queen Wilhelmina when he presented her an Extraordinary Police Order. Such an extreme regulation of the post-war police organisation required parliamentary approval, the Queen said.

After the war, he was a board member of the Nationaal Comité Handhaving Rijkseenheid (National Committee for the Maintenance of Unity of the Kingdom) against the independence of Indonesia and member of the Council of State for fourteen years.
