= USS Renville =

1944 Haskell-class attack transport

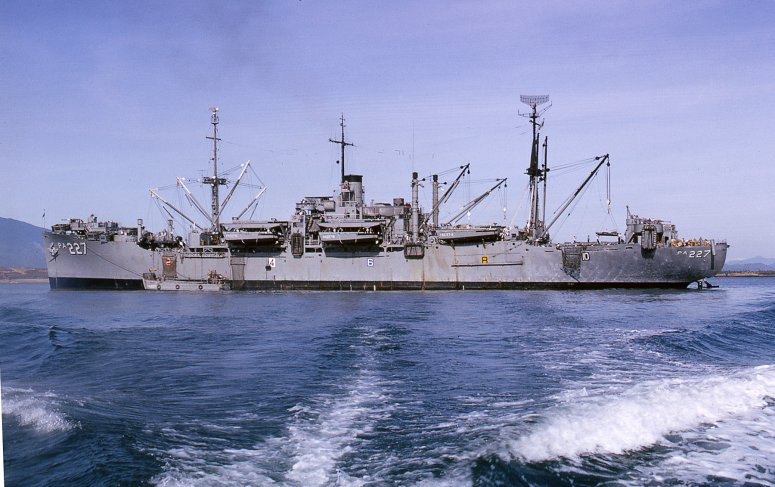
- USS Renville (APA-227) at anchor off the coast of South Vietnam, 1966

History

United States
- Name: USS Renville (APA-227)
- Namesake: Renville County, Minnesota; Renville County, North Dakota
- Builder: Kaiser Shipbuilding
- Laid down: 19 August 1944
- Launched: 25 October 1944
- Sponsored by: Mrs Orpha Penderville
- Commissioned: 15 November 1944
- Decommissioned: 23 April 1968
- Reclassified: LPA-227, 1 January 1969
- Stricken: 1 September 1976
- Honours and awards: One battle star for World War II, two for the Korean War, and four for the Vietnam War
- Fate: Disposed of 19 February 1982, fate unknown

General characteristics
- Class & type: Haskell-class attack transport
- Displacement: 6,873 tons (lt), 14,837 t. (fl)
- Length: 455 ft
- Beam: 62 ft
- Draft: 24 ft
- Propulsion: 1 x Westinghouse geared turbine, 2 x Combustion Engineering header-type boilers, 1 x propeller, designed shaft horsepower 8,500
- Speed: 18 knots (33 km/h)
- Boats & landing craft carried: 2 x LCM, 12 x LCVP, 3 x LCPU
- Capacity: 86 Officers 1,475 Enlisted
- Crew: 56 Officers, 480 enlisted
- Armament: 1 x 5"/38 caliber dual-purpose gun mount, 1 x quad 40mm gun mount, 4 x twin 40 mm gun mounts, 10 x single 20mm gun mounts
- Notes: MCV Hull No. 673, hull type VC2-S-AP5

USS Renville (APA-227) was a Haskell-class attack transport that saw service with the United States Navy in World War II, the Korean War and the Vietnam War.

Renville was named after counties in Minnesota and North Dakota. She was laid down 19 August 1944 as MCV hull 673 by Kaiser Shipbuilding of Vancouver, Washington, launched 25 October 1944, and commissioned 15 November 1944.

== Operational service ==
=== World War II ===
Following shakedown out of San Diego, Renville sailed in January 1945 for Guadalcanal where, in March, she embarked 1,620 combat-ready troops for the invasion of Okinawa.

==== Invasion of Okinawa ====
Renville's assault boats transported the troops to the beach at Okinawa 1 April. Departing on the 5th, she steamed via Saipan and Pearl Harbor to San Francisco. During the remainder of the war, she transported troops and supplies between various Pacific Islands and the United States.

=== After hostilities ===
In September, she carried 1,436 Allied prisoners of war from Japan to Manila. In 1946 she returned additional troops to the United States, and then operated along the Pacific coast.

=== Peacetime missions ===
Operating in the western Pacific, Renville was ordered to Jakarta, Indonesia, in December 1947. Renville became Headquarters ship for the U.N. Truce Commission that negotiated settlement terms between Indonesian nationalists and Dutch military forces. Indonesian and Dutch representatives began meeting aboard Renville in the harbor at Jakarta on 8 December 1947. This resulted in the Renville agreement of 17 January 1948. After operating off the U.S. West Coast from May 1948 to January 1949, she voyaged to China later in January, and returned from Qingdao, China 8 February. She arrived in San Diego, California 26 February 1949.

=== Korean War ===
Decommissioned 30 June 1949 at Mare Island, California, Renville recommissioned 5 January 1952 for service in the Korean War. Departing San Francisco for the western Pacific 13 November 1952, she shuttled troops between Japan and Korean ports such as Pusan and Inchon. After June 1953, she steamed to San Diego.

=== Peacetime missions ===
Sailing for the western Pacific in September 1954, she carried marines to Kobe, Japan, and conducted amphibious training in Korea, before returning to San Diego on 17 March 1955. Departing San Diego in August, she participated in a landing exercise at Iwo Jima in February 1956, and returned to San Diego in March. In January 1957, she joined a landing exercise at Camp Pendleton. On WestPac tour from February to September, she joined a major landing exercise on eastern Luzon in March and another in the Pohang-Dong area of Korea in June.

After duty at Eniwetok from January to June 1958, she operated in the western Pacific from October 1958 to March 1959. In May 1959 she joined a landing exercise at Camp Pendleton. On WestPac tour from October 1958 to April 1959, she was station ship at Hong Kong in January and February, and participated in a joint landing exercise at Taiwan in March. Again in the Far East from April to 5 December 1961, she sailed to Okinawa, Subic Bay, Hong Kong, Taiwan, and Yokosuka.

=== Cuban Missile Crisis ===
Following West Coast duties in early 1962, she headed for the Caribbean 27 October 1962 in response to the Cuban Missile Crisis, returning to San Diego 13 December. Deployed to WestPac from December 1962 to May 1963, she ended 1963 in West Coast operations.

=== Role in Hollywood film ===
Sailing for WestPac in June 1964, she participated in the filming on Oahu, Hawaii, of Otto Preminger's movie In Harm's Way in July.

=== Vietnam War ===
In response to the Gulf of Tonkin Incident in August, she ranged the coast of Vietnam from Da Nang to Saigon with 1,350 marines on alert status for 67 consecutive days. Replenished at Yokosuka, she performed similar duty off Vietnam in November, before returning to San Diego on 18 December.

After a landing exercise at Camp Pendleton, California, in March 1965, her WestPac tour of May to August took her to Hawaii, Okinawa, Da Nang, Qui Nhon, Sasebo, and Yokosuka. After local duty, she began her WestPac tour of March 1966 to October, carrying marines to Okinawa and Chu Lai, Vietnam, before serving as station ship at Da Nang in August and September.

== Decommission ==
In 1967 she prepared for deactivation. Transferred to the Maritime Administration (MARAD) 23 April 1968, she joined the National Defense Reserve Fleet, Suisun Bay, California. She was redesignated an amphibious transport (LPA-227) on 1 January 1969. She was struck from the Naval Vessel Register on 1 September 1976 and disposed of by MARAD on 19 February 1982. Her final disposition is unknown.

On the disposition of the USS Renville, APA-227. A letter from Mr. Shawn Ireland, MARAD, Ship Disposal Program, dated 19 March 2007.

"I was able to locate some additional information regarding the subject vessel and the transaction (its disposal). The Trade-in Exchange Program was enacted by Congress to allow MARAD to add vessels to the National Defense Reserve Fleet that, according to their owners, had become economically obsolete, but were still operable and could suit the NDRF sea lift purpose. The trade-in vessels had to be constructed in the United States and must not have been documented under a foreign flag. This program allowed US Flag vessel owners to trade in there economically obsolete ships in exchange for older vessels in the NDRF that were scheduled for scrapping. The vessels removed from the NDRF had to be scrapped and could not be used for operations.

MARAD, Farrell Lines Inc., and C.W. Enterprises and Investments Inc. entered into agreements on 19 February 1982, which consisted of the following. 1. Farrell Lines would trade in the vessel AMBASSADOR and receive (4) obsolete NDRF vessels, the BEXAR (LPA-237), the RENVILLE (APA-227), the NAVARRO (LPA-215), and the BOLLINGER (LPA-234). 2. Contract MA-10708, between MARAD, Farrell Lines Inc., and C.W. Enterprises and Investments Inc., transferred title to the vessel to Farrell and then immediately to C.W. Enterprises for the sole purpose of scrapping the vessels in either Taiwan or South Korea. The contract is explicit, in that the vessels must be scrapped. C.W. Enterprise and Investments sounds like a broker, who in turn would sell the vessels for scrap to the highest bidder in either Taiwan or South Korea. I am positive that the RENVILLE, along with the three other ships, were scrapped in Taiwan or South Korea."

Submitted by R.R. Bradshaw

== Decorations ==
Renville received one battle star for World War II service, two for the Korean War, and four for the Vietnam War.
