= Goënga =

Goënga Goaiïngea
- Village
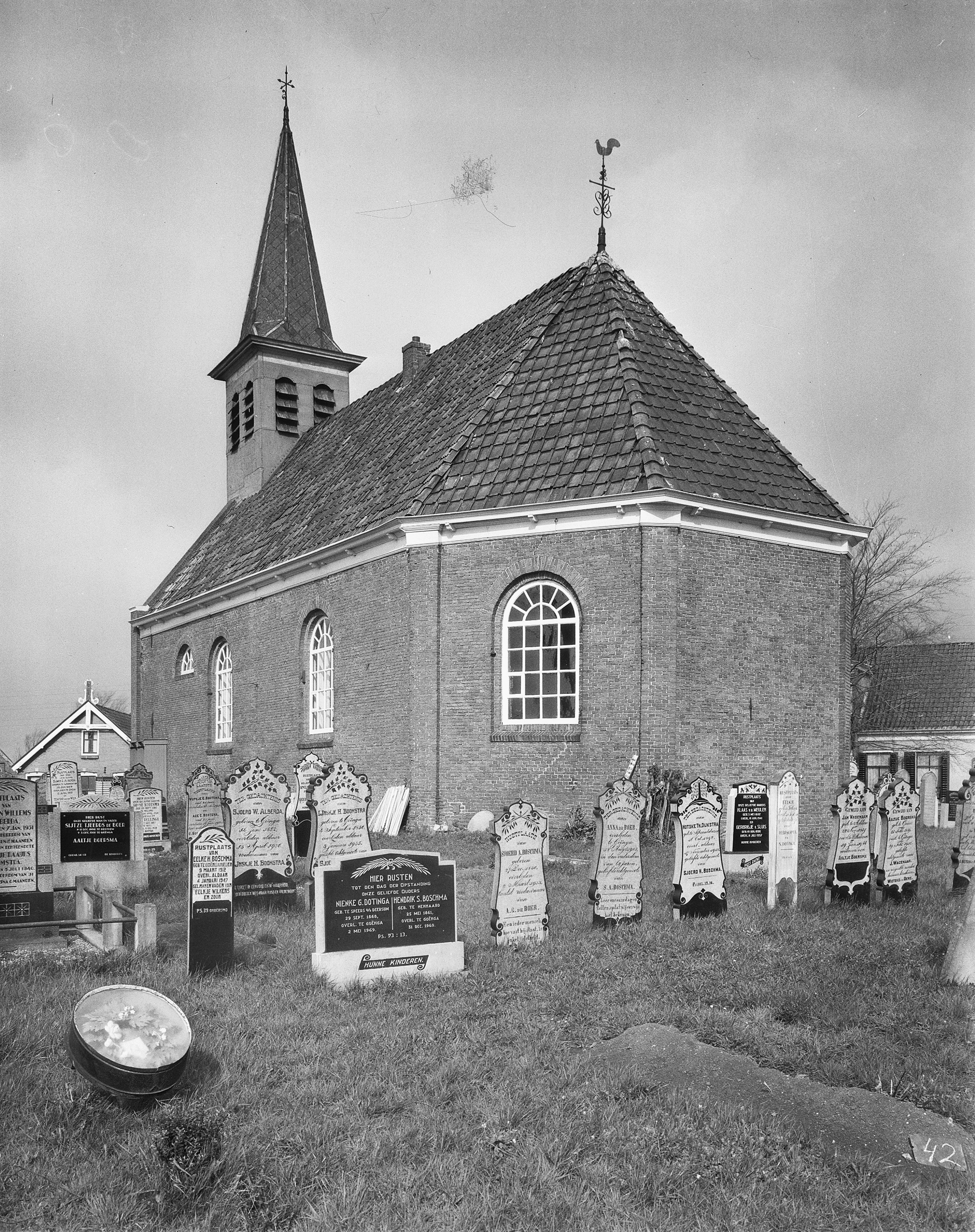
- Goënga Church (1959)

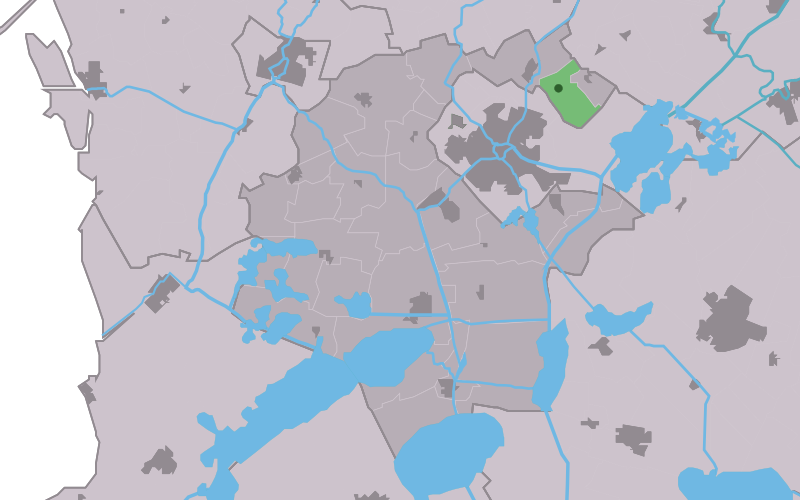
- Location in the former Wymbritseradiel municipality

- Location in the Netherlands Goënga (Netherlands)
- Country: Netherlands
- Province: Friesland
- Municipality: Súdwest-Fryslân

Area
  - Total: 1.52 km^{2} (0.59 sq mi)
- Elevation: −0.2 m (−0.66 ft)

Population (2021)
  - Total: 255
  - Density: 168/km^{2} (435/sq mi)
- Time zone: UTC+1 (CET)
  - Summer (DST): UTC+2 (CEST)
- Postal code: 8628
- Dialing code: 0515

Goënga (West Frisian: Goaiïngea) is a village in Súdwest-Fryslân municipality in the province of Friesland, the Netherlands. It had a population of around 240 in January 2017.

== History ==
The village was first mentioned in 13th century as Goingum, and means "settlement of the people of Goaije". Goënga is a terp (artificial living hill) village from the middle ages. It was located to the east of the former Middelzee. It was connected to Sneek via a canal.

The Dutch Reformed church dates from 1758 and has a tower from 1787 which contains a bell from 1342 made by Stephanus. The former clergy house has been turned into a private house.

Goënga was home to 183 people in 1840. Before 2011, the village was part of the Wymbritseradiel municipality. Nowadays it a part of the Súdwest-Fryslân.

== Gallery ==
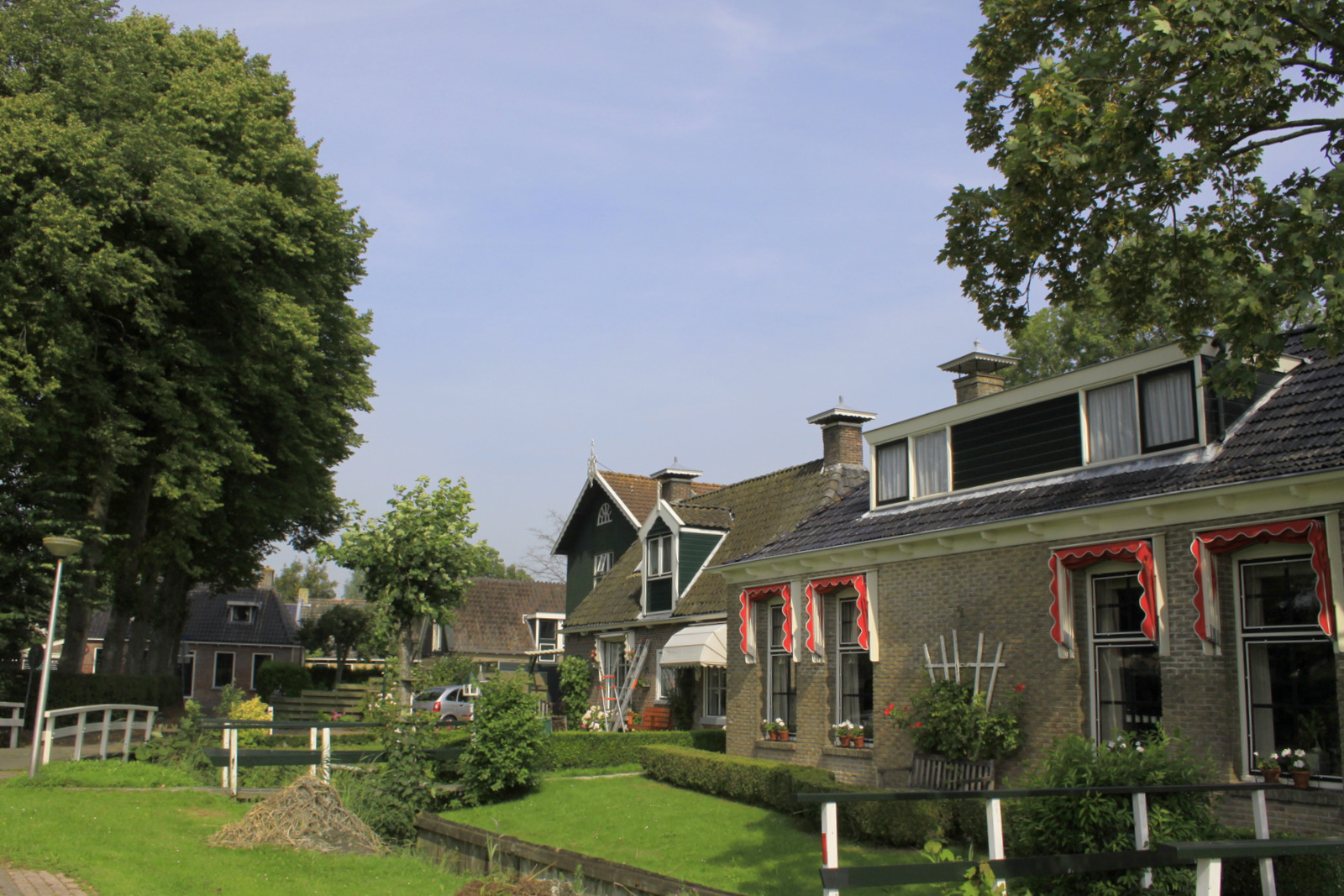
Houses in Goënga

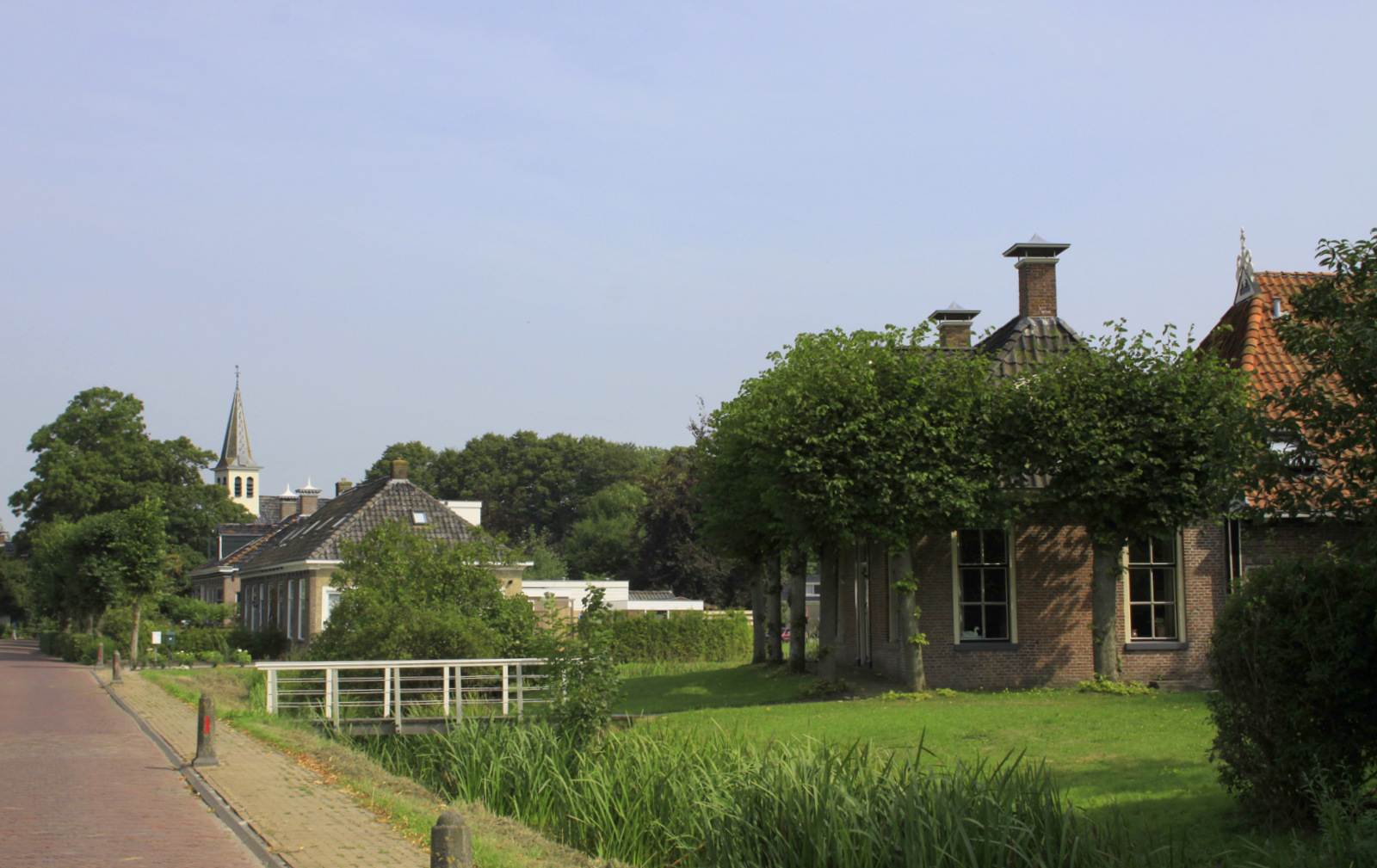
View on Goënga
