= Renville Agreement =

1948 UN-brokered Dutch–Indonesian ceasefire

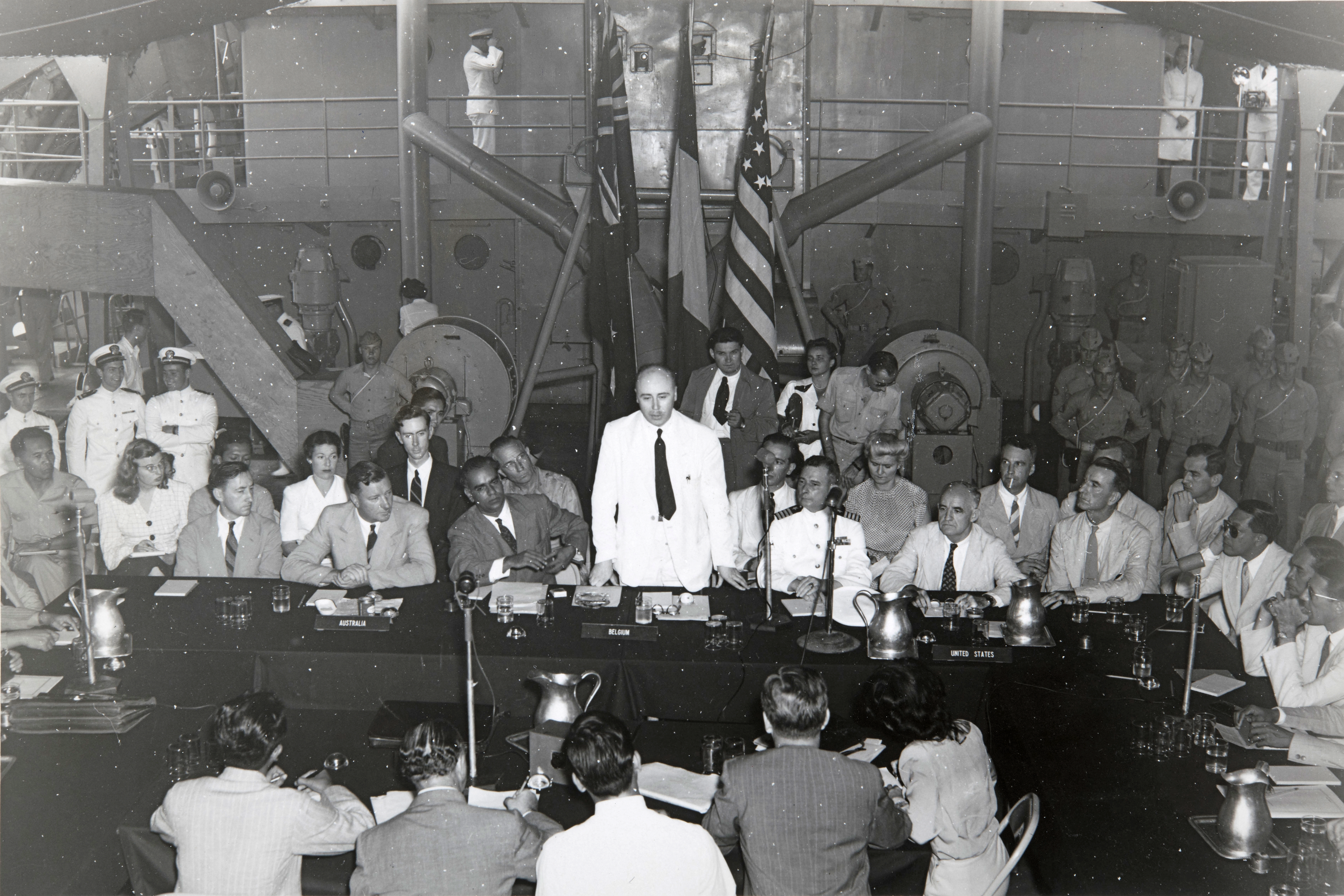
- Delegations of the Kingdom, the Republic and the Commission of the Good Offices during the first plenary meeting on the American troopship Renville, Monday, Dec. 1947
- Type: Ceasefire Agreement
- Context: Operation Product during the Indonesian National Revolution
- Signed: January 17, 1948
- Location: USS Renville, Jakarta Bay
- Mediators: United States; Australia; Belgium
- Parties: Indonesia; Netherlands

The Renville Agreement was a United Nations Security Council-brokered political accord between the Netherlands, which was seeking to re-establish its colony in Southeast Asia, and Indonesian Republicans seeking Indonesian independence during the Indonesian National Revolution. Ratified on 17 January 1948, the agreement was an unsuccessful attempt to resolve the disputes that arose following the 1946 Linggadjati Agreement. It recognised a cease-fire along the Status Quo Line (Status Quo lijn) or so-called "Van Mook Line", an artificial line that connected the most advanced Dutch positions.

The agreement is named after USS Renville, the ship on which the negotiations were held while anchored in Jakarta Bay.

== Background ==
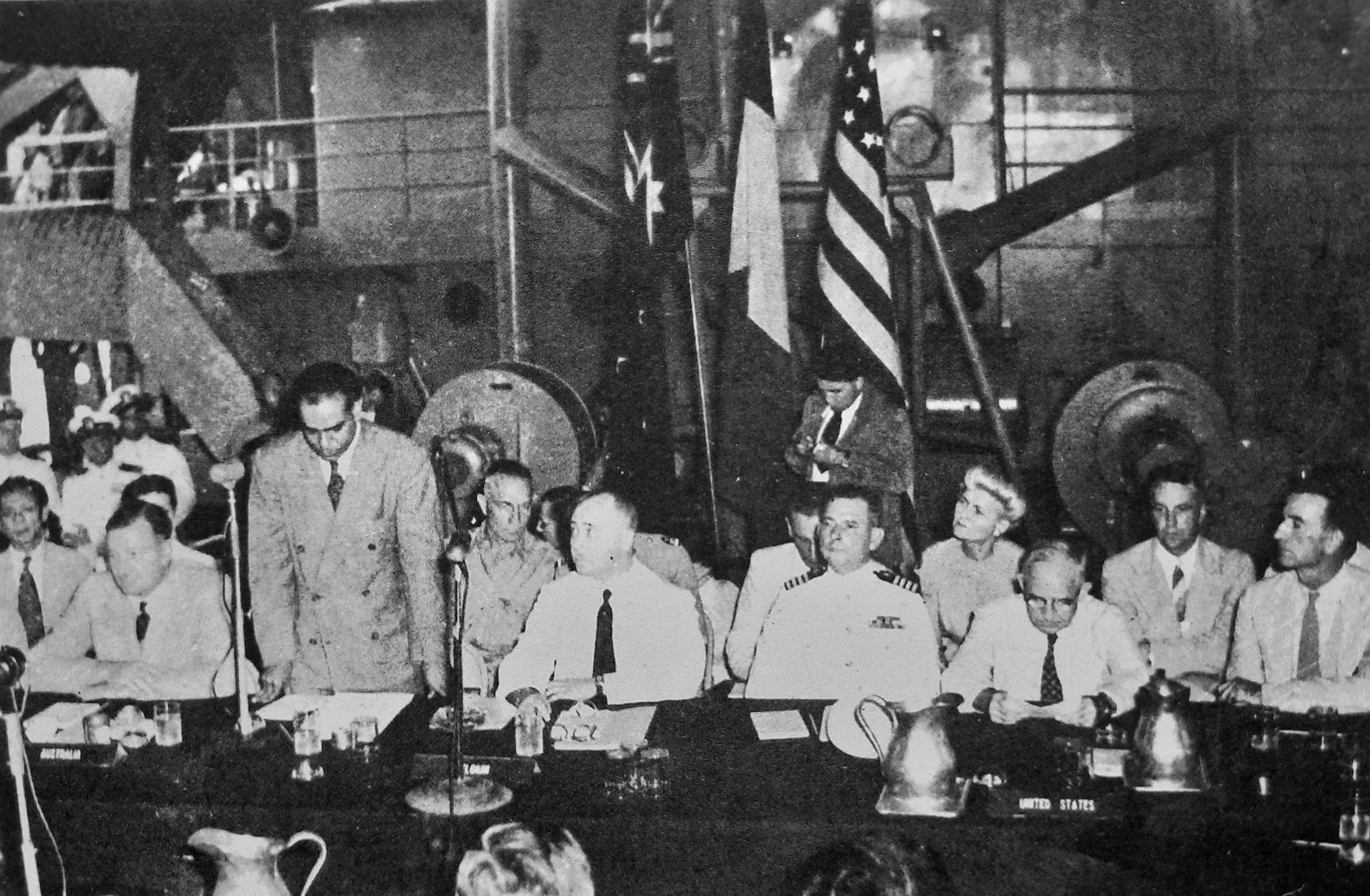
Negotiations underway on the USS Renville on 8 December 1947

On 1 August 1947, an Australian resolution in the United Nations Security Council calling for a ceasefire between the Dutch and Indonesian Republican forces was passed. Dutch Lt. Governor-General Van Mook gave the ceasefire order on 5 August. On 25 August, the Security Council passed a resolution proposed by the United States that the Security Council tender its good offices to help resolve the Dutch-Indonesian dispute peacefully. This assistance would take the form of a Committee of Good Offices (CGO, known locally in Indonesia as the Trilateral Commission (Indonesian: Komisi Tiga Negara, KTN, not to be confused with the current Trilateral Commission)) made up of three representatives, one appointed by the Netherlands, one by Indonesia and a third, mutually agreed by both sides. The Dutch chose a representative from Belgium, Indonesia chose one from Australia and both agreed on the US for the third member. A few days later, on 29 August 1947, the Dutch proclaimed the Van Mook Line, claiming it marked the extent of the areas they held as of the ceasefire. However, the Dutch included areas of Indonesia the Dutch had not reentered. The republic was left with about a third of Java and most of the island of Sumatra, but the republican forces were cut off from the main food-growing regions. A Dutch blockade then stopped arms, food, and clothing from reaching the republicans.

== The negotiations begin ==
There were protracted discussions over the location of talks between the two sides. The Dutch wanted negotiations to take place in Indonesia, while the Indonesians rejected this as they would have to meet while under the threat of the Dutch military. After considering overseas locations and a US battleship, US Assistant Secretary of State Dean Rusk proposed using the unarmed transport ship USS Renville, which was brought to Indonesia and anchored in Jakarta Bay. The first formal session of the CGO began on 8 December 1947.

The republican delegation was led by Indonesian Prime Minister Amir Sjarifuddin, with Johannes Leimena as his deputy. On the Dutch side, the delegation was led by civil service official Col. Raden Abdulkadir Widjojoatmodjo, an Indonesian who had left with the colonial administration when the Japanese invaded the Dutch East Indies and had worked with the Netherlands Indies Civil Administration after the war.

On 26 December as negotiations stalled, the CGO issued a "Christmas Message", a proposal calling for a truce with the Van Mook line as a military boundary. However, Dutch forces withdrew to positions held before the July 1947 military action and the republicans would take over civilian administration upon returning to those areas. The Indonesian side accepted the proposal in its entirety, but the Dutch gave only partial agreement and put forward 12 counter proposals. Among these was a demand for free elections for people to decide their relationship with the future United States of Indonesia and for both sides to guarantee freedom of assembly and speech. The Dutch did not accept troop withdrawals or Indonesian civilian administration in those areas returned to their control. The Dutch also opposed any international observation of the agreement.

== Pressure from the Dutch outside the talks ==
Dutch newsreel discussing the Renville Agreement (from 0:43)

On 19 December, the Dutch prime minister visited Medan and said there must be a quick resolution and that it would be "most regrettable if this last appeal, this last appeal, was not understood". Ten days later, Van Mook announced the establishment of the State of East Sumatra, thus indicating that the Dutch were going ahead with the establishment of a federal state. Then on 4 January 1948, the Dutch organized a conference of representatives they had selected from ten regions of Indonesia. These representatives agreed to form an interim federal government pending the establishment of the United States of Indonesia. The Republic of Indonesia was invited to join as a minority partner.

== Agreement ==
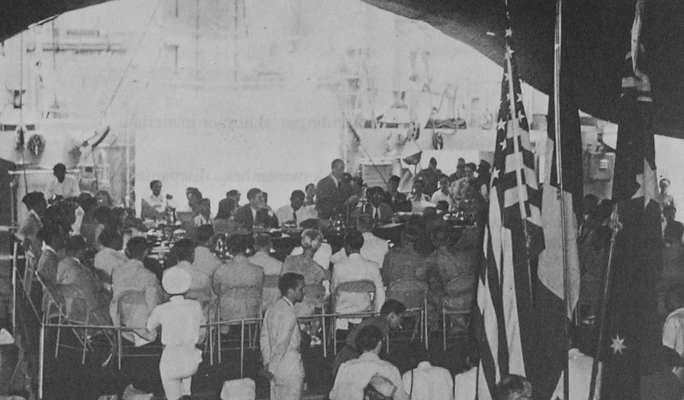
Negotiations underway on USS Renville between the Dutch and the Indonesian republicans

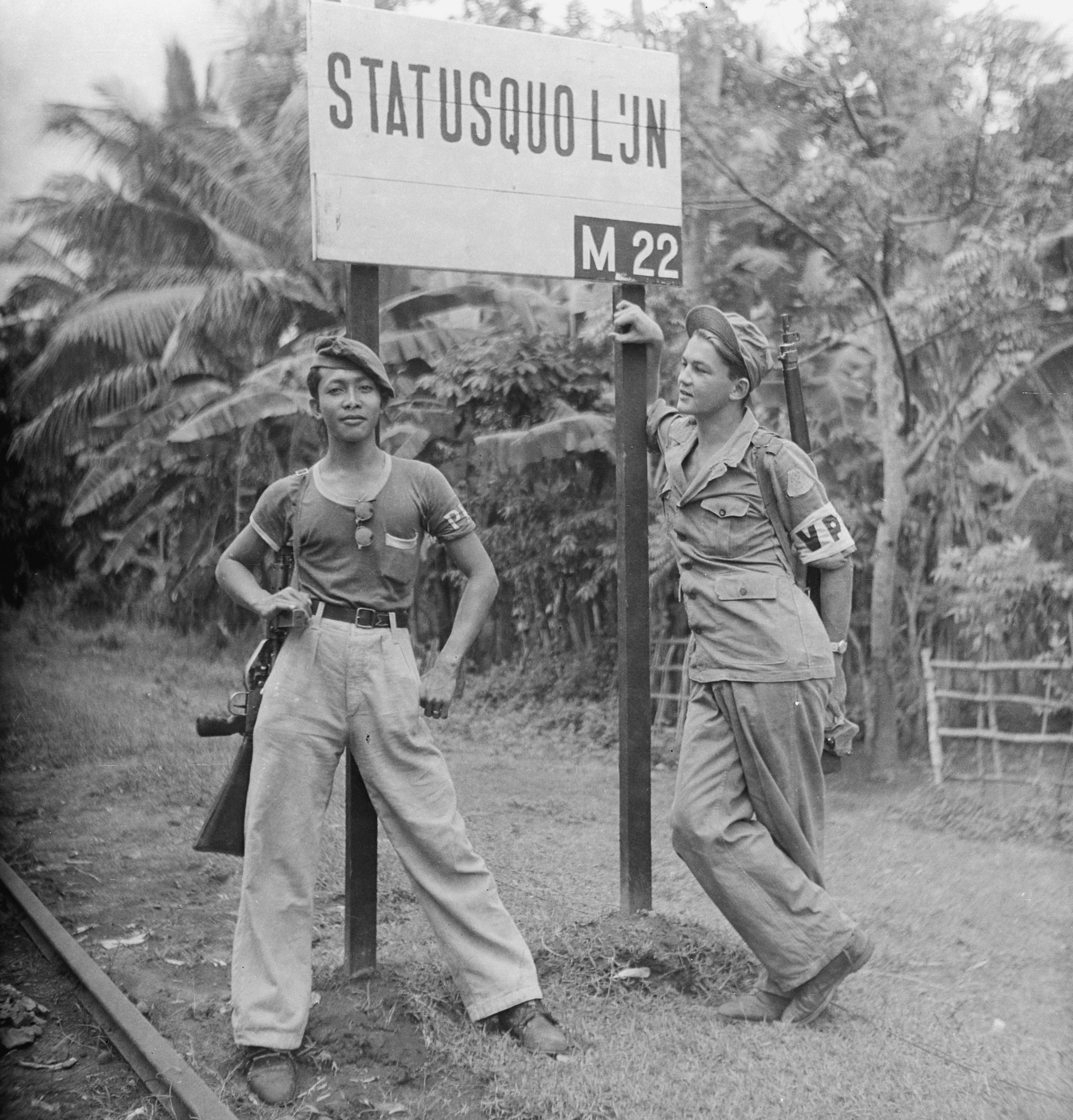
"Status Quo Line" (Van Mook Line) on 12 February 1948

On 9 January, the Dutch delegation said that if the Indonesian side did not accept its proposals within three days, it would ask its government for further instructions. The CGO put forward six principles to counter the 12 from the Dutch. Among their provisions were that Dutch sovereignty would continue until transferred to the United States of Indonesia, with the Republic of Indonesia a component of it; fair representation for each component of the provisional federal state in its government; a referendum within six months to ask people if they wanted their region to the Republic of Indonesia or the United States of Indonesia and a constitutional convention to draw up a constitution. Furthermore, any state would be free to not join the RIS.

The Dutch side said it would accept these proposals if the Republicans accepted them and its original 12 proposals by the 12 January deadline. After a 48-hour extension to the deadline and discussions to clarify the Dutch proposals, Dr Frank Graham, the US member of the CGO, convinced the Republicans to accept, saying they could rely on the US using its influence to ensure the Dutch kept to their side of the bargain. The Indonesian side also felt that referendums in the regions would result in victory for the pro-Republicans and that they would be able to dominate the federal government. Graham also told Amir Sjarifuddin that the US would provide aid to help rebuild a free Indonesia.

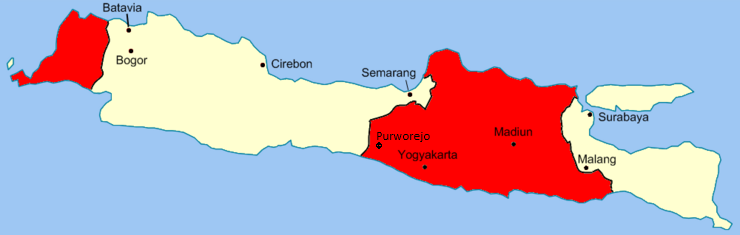
The Van Mook Line in Java. Areas in red were under Republican control.

Initially President Sukarno and Vice-president Hatta opposed the agreement, but after hearing reports of shortages of ammunition and worried that Dutch would attack again if the agreement was not signed, they agreed. They were also reluctant to accept responsibility for substantial civilian and military casualties if the fighting continued. After the Dutch and Republican sides agreed on a truce along the Van Mook Line and the proposals put forward by the CGO and the Dutch, the agreement was signed on the foredeck of USS Renville on 17 January 1948.

== Consequences ==
Diplomatic efforts between the Netherlands and the Republic continued throughout 1948 and 1949. Political pressures, both domestic and international, hindered Dutch attempts at goal formulation. Similarly Republican leaders faced great difficulty in persuading their people to accept diplomatic concessions. By July 1948 negotiations were in deadlock and the Netherlands pushed unilaterally towards Van Mook's federal Indonesia concept. The new federal states of South Sumatra and East Java were created, although neither had a viable support base. The Netherlands set up the Bijeenkomst voor Federaal Overleg (BFO) (or Federal Consultative Assembly), a body comprising the leadership of the federal states, and charged with the formation of a United States of Indonesia and an interim government by the end of 1948. The Dutch plans, however, had no place for the Republic unless it accepted a minor role already defined for it. Later plans included Java and Sumatra but dropped all mention of the Republic. The main sticking point in the negotiations was the balance of power between the Netherlands High Representative and the Republican forces.

Mutual distrust between the Netherlands and the Republic hindered negotiations. The Republic feared a second major Dutch offensive, while the Dutch objected to continued Republican activity on the Dutch side of the Renville line. In February 1948, the Siliwangi Division of the Republican Army, led by Nasution, marched from West Java to Central Java; the relocation was intended to ease internal Republican tensions involving the division in the Surakarta area. The division, however, clashed with Dutch troops while crossing Mount Slamet, and the Dutch believed it was part of a systematic troop movement across the Renville Line. The fear of such incursions actually succeeding, along with apparent Republican undermining of the Dutch-established Pasundan state and negative reports, lead to the Dutch leadership increasingly seeing itself as losing control.

== See also ==
- Timeline of the Indonesian National Revolution
- Dutch police actions
- Linggadjati Agreement
- Round Table Conference
