= Vice-Presidential Edict No.X =

Indonesian edict in 1945

Vice Presidential Edict No. X (Indonesian: Maklumat Wakil Presiden No. X) was an edict issued by Indonesian Vice-president Mohammad Hatta on 16 October 1945 which gave the Central Indonesian National Committee (KNIP), initially a purely advisory body, the authority to become the legislative body of the government.

== Background ==
Following the 17 August 1945 Indonesian Declaration of Independence, on 29 August, the Central Indonesian National Committee (Indonesian: Komite Nasional Indonesia Pusat, KNIP) was established to replace the Preparatory Committee for Indonesian Independence (PPKI) in line with the transitional provisions of the provisional Constitution of Indonesia. Under these provisions, the KNIP was an advisory body pending the election of the legislature, the People's Representative Council (DPR). However the KNIP had no legislative authority as all power was vested in the hands of the president. It comprised 135 members appointed by President Sukarno aided by Vice-president Hatta, including the entire membership of the PPKI.

Resentment over the composition of the cabinet, which was dominated by men who had cooperated with the Japanese during the occupation, and the authoritarian presidential system led to some KNIP members, including former underground figures Sutan Sjahrir and Amir Sjarifuddin, deciding to establish a more democratic system. On 7 October, a petition with 50 signatures demanding legislative powers for the KNIP was handed to Sukarno and Hatta. Both men agreed to implement this change, and on 16 October Hatta issued an edict on behalf of himself and Sukarno giving the KNIP joint legislative powers with the president. The KNIP was to delegate these powers to a Working Committee comprising members of the KNIP which would meet at least once every ten days.

== The edict ==
The edict read as follows:

VICE-PRESIDENTIAL EDICT No.X

CENTRAL NATIONAL COMMITTEE. Granting of Legislative Power to the Central National Committee and to participate in the drawing up of the Broad Outlines of State Policy
PRESIDENT OF THE REPUBLIC OF INDONESIA

AFTER LISTENING TO the deliberations of the Central National Committee concerning the proposal that before the establishment of the People's Consultative Assembly and the People's Representative Council, the legislative power that has thus far been exercised by the President with the assistance of the Central National Committee according to Article IV of the Transitional Provisions of the Constitution be exercised by the Central National Committee and in order that the day-to-day responsibilities of the Central National Committee, given the grave situation, be discharged by a Joint Working Committee that shall be responsible to the Central National Committee;

CONSIDERING that in this grave situation a body is needed which shall share responsibility for the fate of the Indonesian people, alongside the government.

CONSIDERING further that aforementioned proposal was based on the concept of people's sovereignty

Decides:

That the Central National Committee, before the establishment of the People's Consultative Assembly and the People's Representative Council, is granted legislative authority and shall participate in the drawing up of the Broad Outlines of State Policy, and agrees that the day-to-day responsibilities of the Central National Committee, given the grave situation, be discharged by a Joint Working Committee to be selected from among those responsible to the Central National Committee.

DJAKARTA, 16 October 1945

Vice President of the Republic of Indonesia

MOHAMMAD HATTA

== Aftermath ==
On 11 November, the KNIP, demanded the cabinet answer to it, rather to President Sukarno. In response, Sukarno dissolved the cabinet, and on 14 November a new cabinet was announced, with Sjahrir as prime minister and Amir as defense minister. In practice this meant that the 1945 Constitution was suspended, although it officially remained in force.

== Numbering ==
The "X" in the edict does not mean "10". According to Hatta, when the edit was issued, State Secretary Gafar had forgotten to bring the list of numbers used for such documents, so the edit was temporarily numbered "X" until the correct number was determined. However, as the edict was published as "Number X", and as people assumed this was the final title, the State Secretariat felt it was too late to change it.
