= Linggadjati Agreement =

1946 Dutch recognition of Indonesian rule in Java, Madura and Sumatra

Linggadjati Agreement (Note: Popularly misspelled as Linggarjati.)
- A newsreel about the ratification of the Linggardjati Agreement on 15 November 1946 by Indonesian and Dutch representatives.
- Type: political accord
- Signed: 15 November 1946
- Location: Linggadjati, Kuningan Regency
- Parties: Indonesia; Dutch East Indies

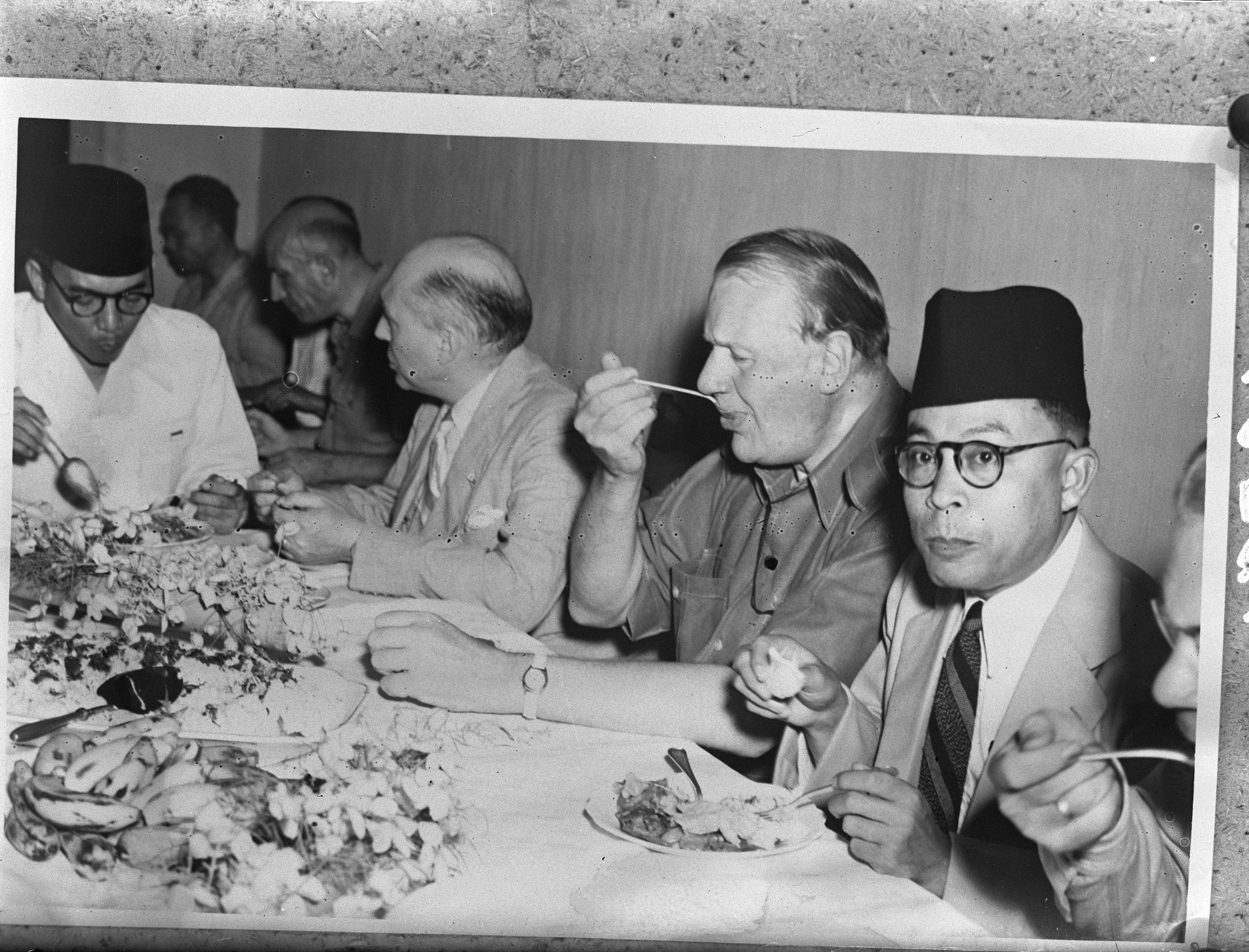
Linggadjati participants: Sukarno, Wim Schermerhorn, Lord Killearn, and Mohammad Hatta at the meal

The Linggadjati Agreement (Linggajati in modern Indonesian spelling) was a political accord concluded on 15 November 1946 by the Dutch administration and the unilaterally declared Republic of Indonesia in the village of Linggajati, Kuningan Regency, near Cirebon in which the Dutch recognised the republic as exercising de facto authority in Java, Madura, and Sumatra.

== Background ==
In 1942, the Japanese occupied the Dutch East Indies. On 17 August 1945, two days after the Japanese surrender, Indonesian nationalist leader Sukarno declared Indonesian independence. The Dutch viewed the Indonesian leadership as collaborators with the occupying Japanese and were determined to reassert their control over the nation by force. Fighting broke out, which developed into a full-scale war of independence between Dutch forces and Indonesian republicans. By mid-1946, both sides were under pressure to negotiate. In July 1946, Acting Governor-General of the Dutch East Indies Hubertus van Mook organised a conference in Malino at which representatives from Borneo and eastern Indonesia backed the proposal for a federal United States of Indonesia with links to the Netherlands.

== The negotiations ==
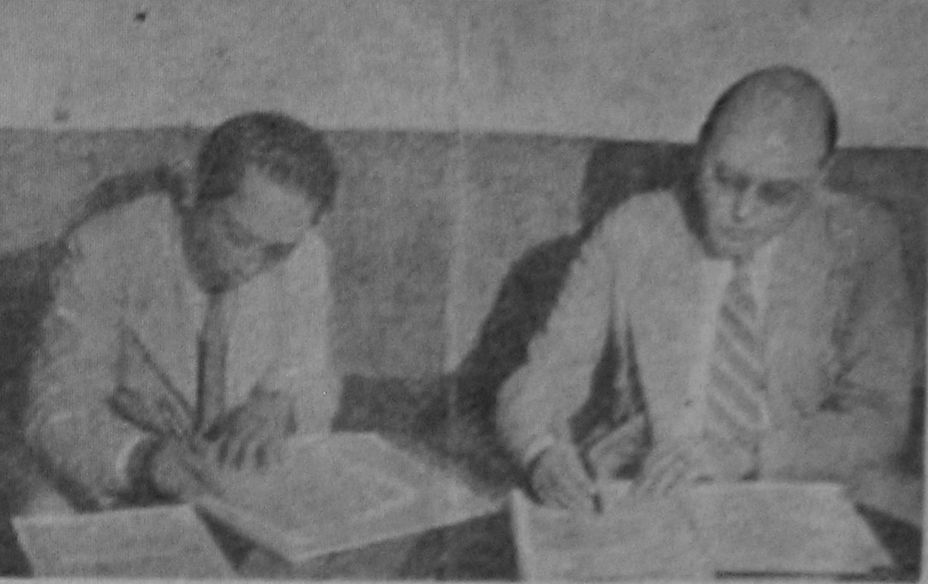
Sutan Sjahrir (left) and Wim Schermerhorn drafting the agreement

On 3 July 1946, a new Dutch government led by Louis Beel was formed, and this government established a Commission-General to set up a new political structure for the Dutch East Indies. This four-member commission, headed by former Dutch Prime Minister Willem Schermerhorn traveled to Jakarta to negotiate with the republican delegation and arrived in Indonesia on 14 September. These negotiations with the Indonesian authorities began on 7 October 1946 and a ceasefire in Java and Sumatra was agreed to and signed on 14 October. Recognizing their still weakened position following World War II, the Netherlands was more prepared to negotiate with the republic than they were later in the Indonesian National Revolution. In November, the negotiations then moved to Cirebon from where it was easier to communicate with Sukarno and Hatta.

Most of the negotiations took place at the residence of the Kwee family of Ciledug, now a museum, in the hill station of Linggadjati around 25 km south of Cirebon, although the final document was initialed in Cirebon. The Dutch side comprised the following:

- Willem Schermerhorn, Dutch Prime Minister from 1945–1946
- F. De Boer, Liberal politician
- Max van Poll, Catholic Party politician
- Hubertus van Mook, Lieutenant General Governor (ex officio)

On the Republican side were:

- Sutan Sjahrir, Prime Minister
- Amir Sjarifuddin, Defense Minister
- Johannes Leimena, Junior Minister of Health, chairman of the Indonesian Christian Party

Former British ambassador to Egypt Lord Killearn acted as an intermediary in the early stages, but he was not needed as the two sides established good relations and initialed the draft agreement on 15 November.

== The agreement ==
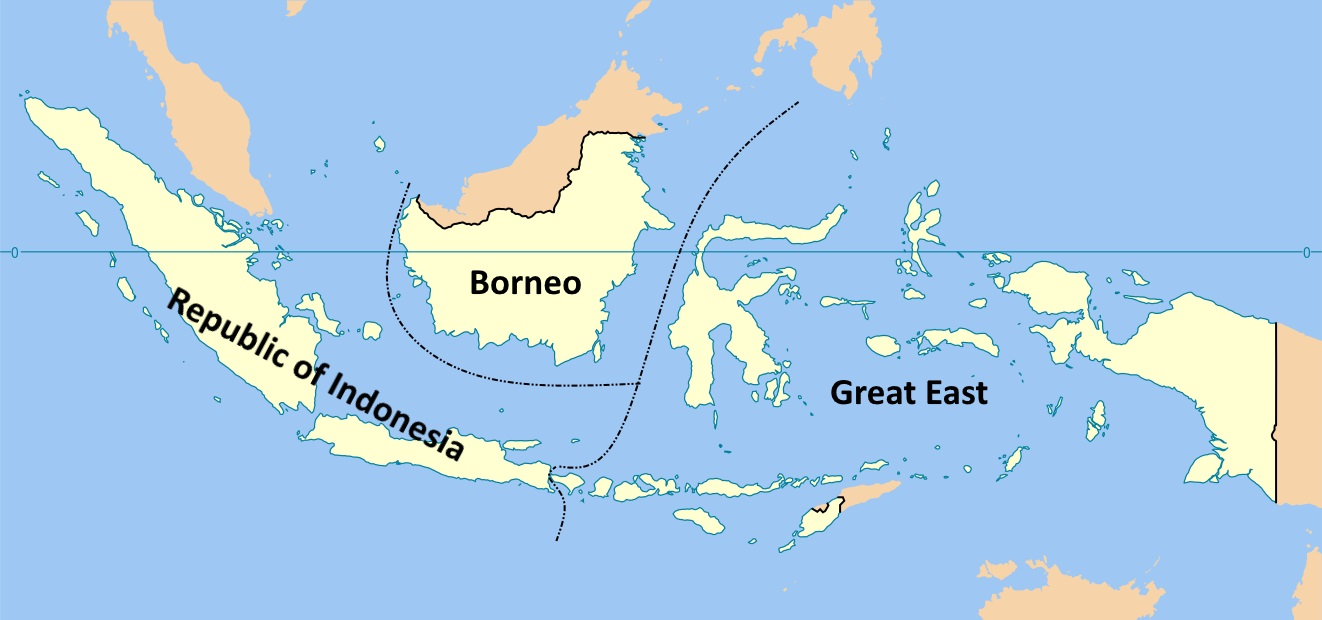
The form of the federal United States of Indonesia agreed at Linggadjati

The agreement comprised an introduction, 17 articles, and a final clause. According to the terms, the Netherlands agreed to recognize the Republic as exercising de facto authority over Java, Sumatra, and Madura (Article 1). The Republic would become one of three constituent states of the federal United States of Indonesia, along with the State of Borneo and the Great Eastern State, comprising the region of the Eastern Dutch East Indies known as the Great East. Any region that did not want to join the USI could determine its relationship with the USI and the Netherlands through a democratic process. (Articles 2, 3 & 4). The constitution of the USI would be drawn up by an elected Constituent Assembly. The Netherlands Indies, together with the Netherlands, Suriname, and the Netherlands Antilles, would form a Netherlands-Indonesian Union with the Dutch monarch as the official head of this Union (Articles 5, 7 & 8). Both the United States of Indonesia and the Union would be established by 1 January 1949 at the latest (Article 12). Once the agreement was signed, both parties would reduce their armed forces (Article 16). Any disputes regarding the agreement would be resolved by arbitration if joint consultation failed. The last resort was to be a ruling by the president of the International Court of Justice.

Both sides made concessions. The republicans committed to the establishment of a federal Indonesian state, while the Dutch conceded the inclusion of Sumatra in the Republic of Indonesia as well as Java. The two sides reached a compromise on the form of the relationship between the USI and the Netherlands. The Dutch had wanted a political union (Dutch: staatsverband), while the Republicans had wanted merely an alliance (Dutch: bondgenootschap). The final agreement was for the USI to be a "sovereign and equal partner in a union", although the Dutch succeeded in persuading the Republicans to agree to the Dutch monarch being the head of this union.

== Ratification and signing ==
The Dutch Commission-General subsequently issued an "Elucidation" to the agreement, interpreting it as a "program of principles" to bring the status of the Dutch kingdom in line with the political facts in the Dutch East Indies. On 10 December 1946, the Dutch government announced its interpretation of the agreement in a statement from Foreign Minister Jan Jonkman. As a result of pressure from the Dutch Catholic Party, which wanted to conduct missionary activities in West Papua, Jonkman stated that the region would not after all be handed over to the United States of Indonesia, a statement at odds with Article 3 of the Linggadjati Agreement. On 19 December, the Dutch parliament ratified the agreement based on the Commission General's Elucidation.

Although the agreement called for the Dutch and the Republican sides to cooperate in the establishment of a federal system, van Mook began to do so unilaterally, and in December, organised the Denpasar Conference which resulted in the establishment of the State of East Indonesia. This increased Republican opposition to the agreement, especially from the Indonesian National Party, Masjumi, and followers of Tan Malaka. This led to the establishment of an opposition group, the Republican Fortress (Indonesian: Benteng Republik). Supporters of Prime Minister Sjahrir and the agreement, including the Socialist Party of Indonesia and the Communist Party of Indonesia formed the Left Wing (Indonesian: Sayap Kiri). To ensure ratification of the agreement, the Central Indonesian National Committee was increased in size through the appointment of government supporters, and this, together with resignation threats from Indonesian leaders Sukarno and Hatta, ensured the agreement was ratified by the Indonesian side on 5 March 1947.

The agreement was signed in Jakarta at 5.30 pm on 25 March 1947 in the presence of 70 guests from the Netherlands, Indonesia, and other nations. The signing was followed by speeches from Schermerhorn, van Mook, and Sjahrir. There were celebrations on the streets of Jakarta and Palembang, South Sumatra. However, the agreement had been interpreted differently by the two sides, particularly regarding the meaning of the terms "cooperation" and "federal".

== Subsequent developments ==
Both sides were unhappy with the agreement, and one member and two advisers to the Commission-General resigned in protest after it was signed. The Dutch were unhappy with the Republic establishing foreign relations and with Indonesia maintaining governors in the area that had become the State of East Indonesia. Meanwhile, the Indonesians complained about the Dutch establishment of states in East Indonesia and West Borneo. The Dutch public's reception of the agreement was mixed – a survey found 38% of respondents supporting the agreement and 36% opposing it. One telegram to members of the Dutch Parliament compared the Linggadjati agreement with the Dutch capitulation to Germany in 1940, questioning why the agreement "extradited seventy million Indonesians to Sukarno".

On 27 May 1947, the Commission General proposed the establishment of a federal council headed by a representative of the Dutch crown to serve as an interim government, as well as a joint police force and the regulation of food distribution. The Republic would not be allowed to have an independent foreign policy. The Dutch would cooperate with "various political entities of Indonesia" rather than exclusively the Republic. The Dutch side asked for a response in 14 days. The Indonesian side viewed this as an ultimatum – capitulate to the Dutch or face military action as it would mean de jure Dutch sovereignty over Indonesia. Sjahrir agreed to an interim government, but with the Republic comprising half the membership and East Indonesia and Borneo the other half, with no Dutch participation. He also rejected a combined police force. The Dutch rejected these counter-proposals, but the concessions that Sjahrir had made cost him political support, leaving him fatally weakened. He resigned on 27 June. Sukarno then declared a state of emergency and took personal charge of the negotiations.

On 29 June, van Mook wrote to Sukarno to repeat the main points that he believed must be agreed on, including continuing Dutch sovereignty and the joint police force. New Prime Minister Amir Sjariffuddin accepted the de jure Dutch authority but refused to agree to the joint police force. The Dutch then also demanded an end to Republican hostilities and the food blockade of Dutch-controlled areas by midnight on 16 July. The Republicans agreed to a ceasefire if the Dutch would also be bound by it. The Indonesian side also suggested arbitration under Article 17 of the agreement. However, on 20 July the Dutch abrogated the Linggadjati Agreement, and following a recommendation by van Mook, Dutch Prime Minister Louis Beel ordered the army to commence military intervention. This began on the night of 20–21 July in the form of Operation Product.

== See also ==
- Timeline of the Indonesian National Revolution
- Nationaal Comité Handhaving Rijkseenheid
- Dutch police actions
- Renville Agreement
