= Adjidarmo Tjokronegoro =

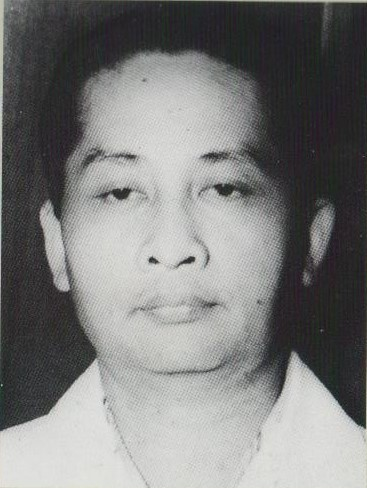
- Tjokronegoro as minister

Minister of Social Affairs
- In office 14 November 1945 – 5 December 1945
- Prime Minister: Sutan Sjahrir
- Preceded by: Iwa Kusumasumantri
- Succeeded by: Sudarsono Mangunadikusumo

Junior Minister of Welfare
- In office 3 July 1947 – 29 January 1948
- Minister: Adnan Kapau Gani
- Preceded by: Jusuf Wibisono
- Succeeded by: Frans Ferdinand Umbas

Member of the Provisional House of Representatives
- In office January 1950 – April 1954

Regional Head of Klaten
- In office 17 December 1957 – 1959

Personal details
- Born: 28 August 1904 Praya, Lombok, Dutch East Indies

Raden Mas Adjidarmo Tjokronegoro (also spelled Hadjidarmo Tjokronegoro; 28 August 1904 – ?) was an Indonesian politician and physician. He was appointed Minister of Social Affairs in the First Sjahrir Cabinet between November and December 1945 and served as Junior Minister of Welfare between July 1947 and January 1948. He also served as regional head of Klaten between 1957 and 1959, along with being a member of the Provisional House of Representatives and the Constitutional Assembly. He studied medicine at STOVIA and at Amsterdam University, practicing in Java.

== Early life ==
Tjokronegoro was born in Praya, Lombok on 28 August 1904. He was a Protestant Christian. He studied at an Europeesche Lagere School (European primary school, graduated 1918) and later at the secondary school Hogere Burgerschool (graduated 1923). He continued his studies at the STOVIA medical school in Batavia, graduating in 1929. After working briefly at a hospital in Batavia, Tjokronegoro studied at Amsterdam University from 1930 and received his medical degree in 1932. He was a member of the student organization Perhimpunan Indonesia in Amsterdam, having previously joined the Jong Java in the Indies.

== Career ==
=== Colonial period ===
Starting in 1935, Tjokronegoro practiced as a doctor at the Ziekenzorg Hospital in Surakarta. In 1937, he opened his own private practice in Banyuwangi, while also serving as vice president of the Krikilan Hospital in Banyuwangi until May 1942. At some point, he joined the Parindra party, though historian Benedict Anderson remarked that he "had no prewar political record of note". During the Japanese occupation of the Dutch East Indies, he was appointed as leader (daitaicho) of the Suishintai paramilitary youth organization's unit in Banyuwangi.

=== Post-1945 ===
Early in the Indonesian National Revolution, Tjokronegoro became chair of the Indonesian National Committee (KNI) in Banyuwangi, and was also appointed to the Central Indonesian National Committee (KNIP). He was appointed Minister of Social Affairs in the First Sjahrir Cabinet on 14 November 1945, but he never assumed office and was replaced by Sudarsono Mangunadikusumo on 5 December 1945. Tjokronegoro maintained his private practice in Banyuwangi until 1947, when he was again appointed to the cabinet, this time as Junior Minister of Welfare in the First and Second Amir Sjarifuddin Cabinets. Politically, he joined the Indonesian Communist Party (PKI), becoming a member of its leadership committee in 1948. He also joined the leadership committee of the Peasants Front of Indonesia (BTI) in 1947, and for a time served as the organization's chairman.

After the end of the revolution, Tjokronegoro was appointed into the Provisional House of Representatives in January 1950, and in 1951 he also established a new private medical practice in Klaten. He was then appointed to the Constitutional Assembly of Indonesia. In December 1957, he was nominated by PKI as regional head of Klaten, and won the election at Klaten's local legislature with 17 votes to 12 on 17 December, defeating a candidate backed by a Masyumi–PNI–Catholic Party coalition. He served until 1959.

In 1963, Tjokronegoro was appointed by President Sukarno into the Economic Operations Supreme Command, a revenue-raising body formed as part of the Indonesia–Malaysia Confrontation. He was relieved from this post on 1 August 1964 by Presidential Order, which stated that his focus on regular work made him unable to perform his duties in the office. Tjokronegoro was absent from historical records afterwards, possibly disappeared in 1965.
