= Sudarsono Mangunadikusumo =

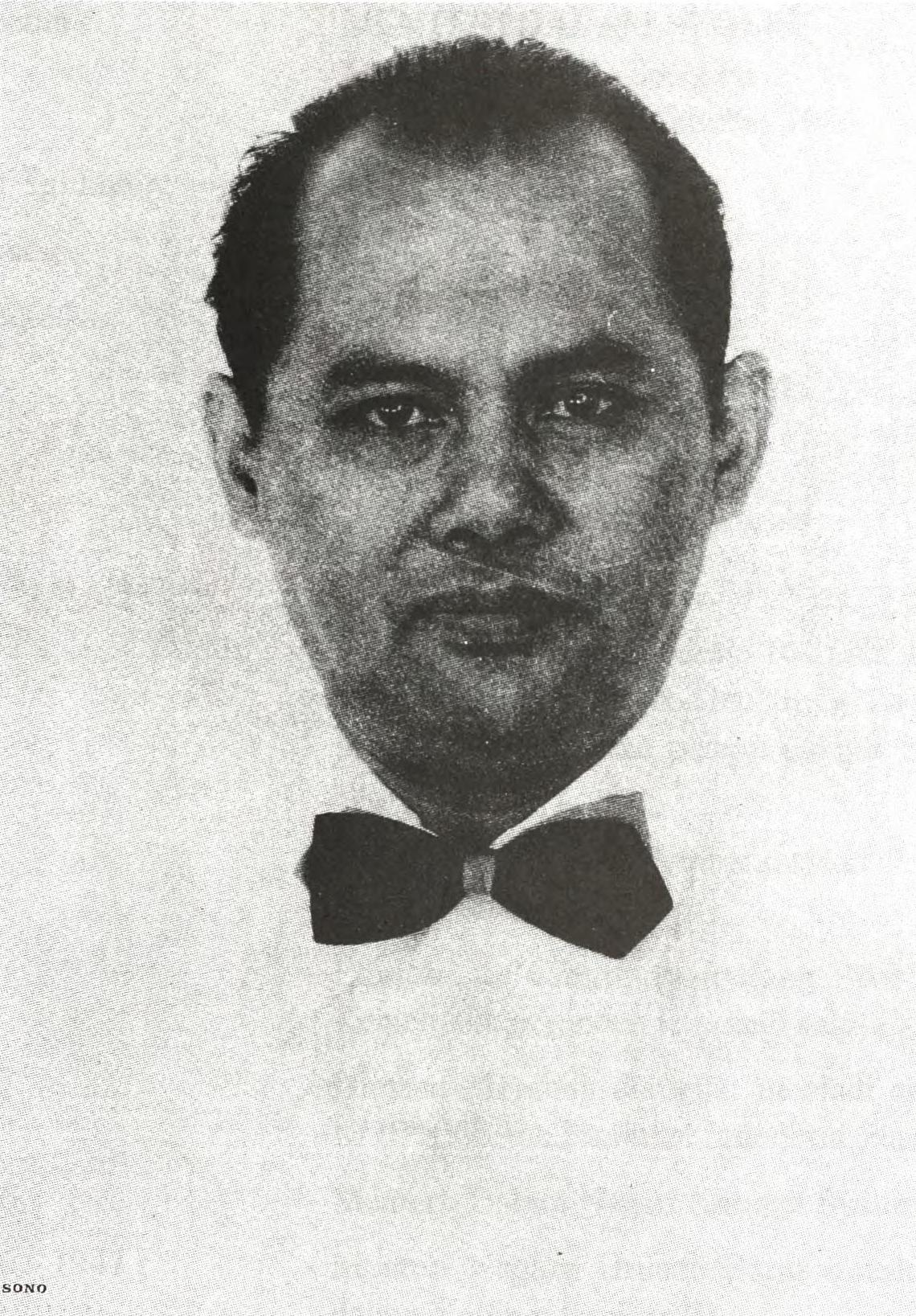

3rd Minister of Home Affairs
- In office 12 March 1946 – 2 October 1946
- Prime Minister: Sutan Sjahrir
- Preceded by: Sutan Sjahrir
- Succeeded by: Mohammad Roem

3rd Minister of Social Affairs
- In office 5 December 1945 – 12 March 1946
- Prime Minister: Sutan Sjahrir
- Preceded by: Adjidarmo Tjokronegoro
- Succeeded by: Maria Ulfah Santoso

1st Indonesian Ambassador to India
- In office 13 February 1950 – 1953
- Preceded by: position created
- Succeeded by: Lambertus Nicodemus Palar

1st Indonesian Ambassador to Yugoslavia
- In office 21 August 1956 – 28 November 1959
- Preceded by: position created
- Succeeded by: Rudolf Alexander Asmaun

Personal details
- Born: 9 May 1911 Salatiga, Dutch East Indies
- Died: 6 June 1976 (aged 65) Jakarta, Indonesia

Sudarsono Mangunadikusumo (9 May 1911 – 6 June 1976) was an Indonesian politician, diplomat, and physician. He served as the Minister of Home Affairs in the Second Sjahrir Cabinet from March to October 1946 and Minister of Social Affairs in the First Sjahrir Cabinet from December 1945 to March 1946. He was then Indonesia's first ambassador to India, serving from 1950 to 1953, and Indonesia's first ambassador to Yugoslavia from 1956 to 1959.

Born in Central Java, Sudarsono studied as a physician and by 1941 had become a practicing doctor in Cirebon. He remained there during the Japanese occupation period, and joined the resistance movement under Sutan Sjahrir. Proclaiming Indonesian independence in Cirebon two days before the Jakarta proclamation, he would join Sjahrir's government as minister by December 1945. He was sent to India in 1947, and became Indonesia's representative and later ambassador there. Following his return, he briefly served in the foreign ministry before being sent to Yugoslavia.

== Early life ==
Sudarsono was born on 9 May 1911 in Salatiga, present-day Central Java. He went through the colonial education system, studying at an ELS (European primary school), MULO (middle school), and AMS (secondary school). He then enrolled at the Geneeskundige Hoogeschool te Batavia (Batavia Medical School), graduating in 1928.

== Career ==
=== Colonial period ===
Sudarsono initially worked in malaria control in Batavia, and for some time worked under the Rockefeller Foundation before moving to become the resident doctor in Ciamis. In 1941, he moved to Cirebon where he worked at the city's hospital. He was briefly chairman of the Pemuda Indonesia (Indonesian Youth) organization from 1928 to 1929. He was also a leading figure in the Indonesia Moeda organization, and was a secretary of the Indonesian Students' Association in Batavia. During the Japanese occupation of the Dutch East Indies, Sudarsono remained as a doctor in Cirebon, and he was appointed leader of the Putera labor propaganda organization in the Cirebon Residency area. Simultaneously, he joined the underground resistance movement led by Sutan Sjahrir.

Following the surrender of Japan, Sjahrir received the news through his secret radio, and he informed nationalist leaders Sukarno and Mohammad Hatta. They told Sjahrir they intended to proclaim independence on 15 August, but later Sukarno and Hatta opted to delay the proclamation. Sjahrir had also informed other leaders in the underground movement including Sudarsono to prepare for a proclamation of independence before the delay, but could not inform him of the delay. Sudarsono, who had gathered hundreds of nationalist youths in Cirebon's alun-alun, proclaimed Indonesia's independence on 15 August, two days before the proclamation in Jakarta by Sukarno and Hatta. Accounts differ on whether the Cirebon proclamation text was written by Sudarsono or Sjahrir, and the text is now lost.

=== Revolution period ===
The Cirebon Independence Monument, commemorating Sudarsono's proclamation.

During the Indonesian National Revolution, Sudarsono was appointed to the Central Indonesian National Committee, and in October 1945 he was appointed to its fifteen-member working body. Sudarsono was a founding member of the Indonesian Socialist Party (which was formed out of the fusion of two newly-founded parties, one Cirebon-based), and joined the party's initial leadership council. On 5 December 1945, Sudarsono was appointed Minister of Social Affairs in the First Sjahrir Cabinet, replacing Adjidarmo Tjokronegoro who had not taken office.

In the Second Sjahrir Cabinet, which took office on 12 March 1946, Sudarsono was reassigned as Minister of Home Affairs. On 18 March, Sudarsono and defense minister Amir Sjarifuddin issued a joint order to "take strong action" against agitators, disturbances, or hindrances against defense works. Notably, this occurred shortly after the arrest of Tan Malaka and his group in Central Java the previous day, though the order was cited as cause for the arrest.

Following negotiations with the Sunanate of Surakarta and anti-Sunanate activists, Sudarsono on 5 May 1946 proclaimed a planned election to determine the territory's status. While Sudarsono worked to form an electoral committee, the anti-Sunanate activists held mass meetings and the local governments of the territory opted to side with the activists over the Sunanate. By 23 May, Sudarsono had empowered East Java governor Ario Soerjo (the central government's negotiator on the issue) to "restore security in the Surakarta area", but arrests ordered by Soerjo resulted in the outbreak of further protests. By early June, the anti-Sunanate activists had effectively taken over power in Surakarta, with the backing of local military units. In the Third Sjahrir Cabinet, taking office on 2 October 1946, Sudarsono was appointed State Minister without Portfolio.

=== Diplomacy ===
==== India ====
Sudarsono (far right) hosting a reception in New Delhi, 1950.

Around the last weeks of the Third Sjahrir Cabinet, Sudarsono was sent as part of a delegation to India to discuss a rice-for-consumer goods trade deal exploring the sale of 1 million tonnes of surplus Indonesian rice. By December 1948, he had become Indonesia's representative to India, and his family had moved there with him. In interviews, he rejected ideas floated in Pakistan's newspapers that Indonesia become an Islamic country and instead claimed that Indonesia would become an "Asian nationalist and democratic" country. Along with Alexander Andries Maramis, Sudarsono periodically met with Jawaharlal Nehru to discuss Indonesia's situation late in the revolution.

On 13 February 1950, Sudarsono was officially appointed Indonesia's first ambassador to India. While ambassador in India, Sudarsono also attended the 7th United Nations Economic and Social Commission for Asia and the Pacific in Lahore, and he was vice-chairman in the conference. By 1953, Sudarsono noted that Indonesia's relations with India "were not as warm as they used to be". He was replaced as ambassador by Lambertus Nicodemus Palar in mid-1953.

==== Foreign ministry ====
After his return from India in June 1953, Sudarsono became head of the Asia Pacific directorate in the Ministry of Foreign Affairs. Sudarsono was also appointed on 19 June 1953 to chair an ad hoc committee to negotiate reparations for the Japanese occupation. The committee included Soenario, who would shortly after become foreign minister under Prime Minister Ali Sastroamidjojo. Sastroamidjojo would send Sudarsono and Soenario as part of a delegation to Japan to discuss the reparations, but negotiations stalled on the amount of reparations to be paid. Sudarsono did secure an agreement on salvage rights for sunken Japanese ships in Indonesian waters (estimated at 150 thousand tonnes).

Related to the negotiations, a scandal broke out as Sudarsono pushed the Ministry of Finance to approve the formation of a Japan–Indonesia Bank without Soenario's knowledge. On 31 March 1954, Soenario provisionally relieved Sudarsono of his duties by telephone over the scandal. He remained in the ministry, however, and by August 1955 had been reappointed as head of the ministry's coordination inspectorate. By December 1955, he was head of the ministry's planning bureau, and was tasked with corresponding with the American ambassador in Jakarta to gain aid for Indonesia's position on the West New Guinea dispute.

==== Yugoslavia ====
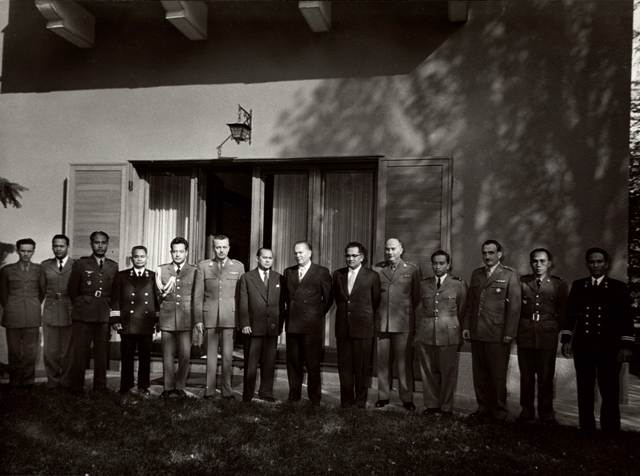
Indonesian military delegation in Belgrade, 1957.

In late 1954, Indonesia's government began to engage in diplomatic relations with Yugoslavia, and Sudarsono (as a Socialist Party higher-up) had been engaged in discussions with the Yugoslavian chargé d'affaires in Jakarta. Sudarsono was appointed Indonesia's first ambassador to Yugoslavia in 1956, and he presented his credentials on 21 August 1956. During his time in Belgrade, Sudarsono became involved in a car accident on 17 November 1956. Sudarsono and Indonesia's military attache suffered minor injuries, but their Yugoslavian driver was killed.

The Revolutionary Government of the Republic of Indonesia (PRRI), proclaimed in 1958, resulted in the resignations and withdrawals of multiple Indonesian ambassadors sympathetic to PRRI, such as Sutan Mohammad Rasjid in Italy. Sudarsono was similarly withdrawn from Belgrade, but after discussions with Indonesian government representatives, during which Sudarsono cited his loyalty to Sukarno and personal reasons (his sick wife in Belgrade), he was retained. He was eventually recalled and replaced by Rudolf Alexander Asmaun by a decree on 28 November 1959. After the defeat of PRRI, nearly all former Socialist Party leaders were imprisoned, Sudarsono being an exception.

== Personal life ==
Sudarsono was married to Muspiah. In 1962, Yugoslavian government reports noted that Sudarsono had suffered a heart attack and afterwards "completely changed" into a religious man. He died on 6 June 1976 in Jakarta, and was buried at the Kalibata Heroes' Cemetery. President Suharto posthumously awarded him the Star of Mahaputera, 2nd class on 7 August 1995.

His youngest son, Juwono Sudarsono, later served in multiple ministerial roles in the Indonesian government.
