= Third Sjahrir Cabinet =

Fourth cabinet of Indonesian government

Third Sjahrir Cabinet Kabinet Sjahrir III
- 4th Cabinet of Indonesia
- 1946–1947
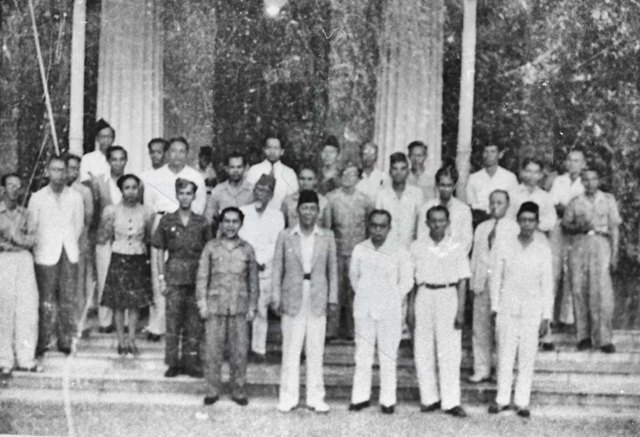
- Date formed: 2 October 1946
- Date dissolved: 3 July 1947

People and organisations
- Head of state: Sukarno
- Head of government: Sutan Sjahrir
- No. of ministers: 31 ministers
- Member party: PSI; Parkindo; Masyumi; PNI; PKI; Labour; BTI; Independent
- Status in legislature: KNIP; Minority: 49 / 200

History
- Predecessor: Sjahrir II Cabinet
- Successor: Amir Sjarifuddin I Cabinet

The Third Sjahrir Cabinet (Indonesian: Kabinet Sjahrir III) was the fourth Indonesian cabinet. It served from October 1946 to July 1947, when it fell due to disagreements related to the implementation of the Linggadjati Agreement and subsequent negotiations with the Dutch.

== Background ==
Following the kidnapping of Prime Minister Sutan Sjahrir, those responsible attempted a coup against the Sukarno-Hatta government, with the cabinet replaced by a "Supreme Political Council" headed by Tan Malaka and President Sukarno's military powers transferred to General Sudirman. General Sudarsono, whose troops had carried out the kidnappings, traveled to Jakarta with Muhammad Yamin to meet the president, but both were arrested. Sukarno eventually persuaded Sudirman to back Sjahrir and support the arrest of the rebels, including Tan Malaka.

In the middle of August 1946, the Central Indonesian National Committee (KNIP) said circumstances now justified the restoration of a parliamentary cabinet. Sjahrir was again appointed to form it, but with less freedom to choose the membership than he had enjoyed with his first two cabinets. After six weeks of negotiation, the new cabinet was announced on 2 October. It included members from a wide range of parties, representation from the Chinese and Arab communities, and a female member. On the same day, Sukarno revoked the state of emergency and issued a decree appointing Sjahrir head of the government. The president officially inaugurated the cabinet on 5 October in Cirebon, West Java.

== Composition ==
=== Prime minister ===
- Prime Minister: Sutan Sjahrir (Socialist Party)

=== Departmental Ministers ===
- Minister of Foreign Affairs: Sutan Sjahrir
- Minister of Home Affairs: Mohammad Roem (Masyumi Party)
- Minister of Justice: Soesanto Tirtoprodjo (Indonesian National Party - PNI)
- Minister of Finance: Sjafruddin Prawiranegara (Masyumi)
- Minister of Welfare: Dr. A. K. Gani (PNI)
- Minister of Health: Dr. Darma Setiawan
- Minister of Education: Soewandi
- Minister of Social Affairs: Maria Ulfah Santoso (Perwari/PPI)
- Minister of Religious Affairs: K. H. Fathoerrachman (Masyumi)
- Minister of Defense: Amir Sjarifuddin (Socialist Party)
- Minister of Information: Muhammad Natsir (Masyumi Party)
- Minister of Transportation: Djuanda
- Minister of Works: Martinus Putuhena (Indonesian Christian Party - Parkindo)

=== State Ministers (without portfolio) ===
- State Minister: Sri Sultan Hamengkubuwana IX
- State Minister: Wahid Hasyim (Masyumi)
- State Minister: Wikana (Youth Congress Board)
- State Minister: Sudarsono Mangunadikusumo (Socialist Party)
- State Minister: Tan Po Goan (Socialist Party)
- State Minister: Danudirdja Setiabudi

=== Junior Ministers ===
- Junior Minister of Foreign Affairs: Agus Salim
- Junior Minister of Home Affairs: Wijono (Indonesian Peasants Front)
- Junior Minister of Justice: Hadi
- Junior Minister of Finance: Lukman Hakim (PNI)
- Junior Minister of Welfare: Joesoef Wibisono (Masyumi)
- Junior Minister of Health: Dr. Johannes Leimena (Parkindo)
- Junior Minister of Education: Goenarso
- Junior Minister of Social Affairs: Abdul Madjid Djojoadiningrat (Socialist Party)
- Junior Minister of Defense: Harsono Tjokroaminoto (Masyumi)
- Junior Minister of Information: Abdurrahman Baswedan
- Junior Minister of Transportation: Setyadjit Soegondo (PBI)
- Junior Minister of Public Works: Herling Laoh (Indonesian National Party - PNI)

== The end of the cabinet ==
On 25 March 1947, Indonesia and the Netherlands signed the Linggadjati Agreement. This was a result of pressure on the Dutch from the British, who planned to withdraw the forces they had had in Indonesia since the end of World War II, to come to an agreement with the Indonesians. The agreement recognized de facto Indonesian sovereignty over Java and Sumatra and called for the establishment of a federal United States of Indonesia. However the two sides increasingly disagreed over the agreement and accused each other of violations. Following a Dutch ultimatum on 27 May 1947, which the Indonesian government saw as a threat of war, later clarified by Lieutenant General Governor van Mook, Sjahrir made a series of concessions, including interim Dutch sovereignty and control over foreign policy. Many left wing members of the cabinet, including Amir Sjarifuddin and Wikana condemned these concessions, and one by one the minor parties abandoned Sjahrir. They were subsequently joined by Masyumi. In the face of this opposition, Sjahrir resigned in the early hours of 27 June. Sukarno once again declared a state of emergency and asked the cabinet to remain in office until it was replaced.
