= Setiadi Reksoprodjo =

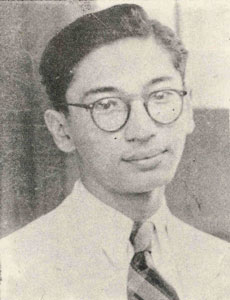

Minister of Electricity and Energy
- In office 25 May 1965 – 18 March 1966
- President: Sukarno
- Preceded by: Office established
- Succeeded by: Office abolished

Member of the People's Consultative Assembly
- In office 15 September 1960 – 25 May 1965
- President: Sukarno

Member of the Constitutional Assembly
- In office 9 November 1956 – 5 July 1959
- President: Sukarno

Junior Minister of Information
- In office 11 November 1947 – 29 January 1948
- President: Sukarno
- Prime Minister: Amir Sjarifuddin
- Preceded by: Sjahbuddin Latief
- Succeeded by: Office abolished

Minister of Information
- In office 3 July 1947 – 11 November 1947
- President: Sukarno
- Prime Minister: Amir Sjarifuddin
- Preceded by: Mohammad Natsir
- Succeeded by: Sjahbuddin Latief

Personal details
- Born: 18 September 1921 Kutoarjo, Central Java, Dutch East Indies
- Died: 28 July 2010 (aged 88) Jakarta, Indonesia
- Resting place: Kalibata Heroes' Cemetery, Jakarta, Indonesia
- Party: Socialist Party (1946—1948)
- Spouse: Koes Soehartini (m. 1951; died 1996)
- Children: 6
- Education: Technische Hoogeschool te Bandoeng (Ir.)

Setiadi Reksoprodjo (18 September 1921 — 28 July 2010) was an Indonesian politician who served as Minister of Information in First Amir Sjarifuddin Cabinet, Junior Minister of Information in Second Amir Sjarifuddin Cabinet, member of the People's Consultative Assembly and the Constitutional Assembly, and as the Minister of Electricity and Energy in Dwikora Cabinet (Dwikora I) and Revised Dwikora Cabinet (Dwikora II). Setiadi was 25 years and 7 months old when he was appointed as Minister of Information, making him the youngest minister in Indonesia up to this day.

Setiadi was born on 18 September 1921, and died on 28 July 2010. He was buried in Kalibata Heroes' Cemetery on 29 July 2010.

== Early life and education ==
Setiadi Reksoprodjo was born on 18 September 1921 in Kutoarjo, a town in the Purworejo Regency of Central Java. He was the oldest son of Javanese aristocrat Soekirdjo Reksoprodjo and Koespirah Soemodidjojo. His father, Soekirdjo Reksoprodjo, held office as the Regent of Kudus from 1952 until 1954.

Setiadi enrolled at the Semarang Hogere Burgerschool (Higher Civic School) in 1933. Setiadi graduated from the school in 1938 with a score of 8,37 at the final exam, the highest score in the exam.

In 1938, Setiadi entered the Technical High School of Bandung (Technische Hoogeschool te Bandoeng, now Bandung Institute of Technology). He graduated from the university in 1941, and obtained engineer's degree (Ir.) in 1942. After his graduation, he was employed by the Japanese government during the Japanese occupation of the Dutch East Indies to work at the West Java Transportation and Irrigation Bureau in Cirebon.

== Political career ==
After the independence of Indonesia, Setiadi Reksoprodjo still maintained his job at the West Java Transportation and Irrigation Bureau. He was also involved in politics, and joined the Indonesian Socialist Party. In 1945, he became the chairman of the Socialist Youth of Indonesia — the party's youth wing — in Cirebon. He was also appointed as the Chairman of the Indonesian National Committee of Cirebon and as the Chairman of the Cirebon Defence Council.

Setiadi was credited for the development of radio broadcasting in Cirebon. He established the Information Radio of Cirebon, Cirebon's first radio station, which was later merged to Radio Republik Indonesia.

Setiadi moved to Yogyakarta — the capital of Indonesia at that time — in January 1947 along with his appointment as the Head of the Public Relations Bureau of the Department of Public Works, a new office. In accordance with his new position, he was appointed as a member of the central executive council of the Socialist Youth of Indonesia.

On 3 July 1947, Amir Sjarifuddin, the new prime minister of Indonesia, announced his first cabinet. Setiadi, who was 25 years and 9 months old at that time, was appointed as the Minister of Information, making him the youngest minister in the cabinet and in the history of Indonesia. His junior minister in the cabinet, Sjahbuddin Latief, was almost twice as old as him (48 years).

Five months later, on 11 November 1947, Amir announced a reshuffle on his cabinet. In Amir's new cabinet, Setiadi and Sjahbuddin exchanged their posts. Sjahbuddin was appointed as the Minister of Information, while Setiadi became the junior minister.

After the cabinet was dissolved on 29 January 1948, Setiadi became an entrepreneur. On the same year, Setiadi's party, the Socialist Party, was split into the Sutan Sjahrir-led Socialist Party of Indonesia and the Amir Sjarifuddin-led People's Democratic Front. Setiadi joined neither.

In 1954, Setiadi ran in the Indonesian Constitutional Assembly election, even though he was not a member of the Communist Party of Indonesia he was nominated as candidate number 22 by the party, representing West Java. Setiadi won a seat and was sworn in on 9 November 1956. Setiadi, along with several other independent candidates on the Constitutional Assembly including Prof. Ir. Saluku Poerbodiningrat, A. Astrawinata S.H, Affandi and Ismail Kartasasmita formed their own fraction named the Proclamation Republic fraction. Setiadi supported the restoration of the 1945 State Constitution of the Republic of Indonesia and the dissolution of the Constitutional Assembly. The Constitutional Assembly was dissolved by the president's decree three years later on 5 July 1959.

Several months later, Setiadi was appointed by President Sukarno as Jakarta's Regional Delegate to the People's Consultative Assembly. Setiadi was inaugurated on 15 September 1960 and held the office until his appointment as minister.

Setiadi was also involved in the World Peace Council. Setiadi was involved in the establishment of the Indonesian Peace Committee, the council's branch in Indonesia, and became the chairman of the committee. He then left the position after he became a World Peace Council executive committee member and was replaced by Mrs. Ratu Amina Hidajat. He later became vice president of the World Peace Council based in Geneva where the International President at that time was Frédéric Joliot-Curie, the son in law of Marie Curie.

On 28 May 1965, President Sukarno reorganized the Dwikora Cabinet. The Minister of Public Works and Power, which was previously under the Development Compartment, was upgraded into a compartment. Accordingly, several new ministries were made in its place. One of the ministries was the Ministry of Electricity and Energy. Setiadi Reksoprodjo was appointed as the Ministry of Electricity and Energy on the same day as the reorganization.

When Setiadi was appointed again for the same office in Sukarno's revised cabinet, a wave of protests surfaced from employees at the ministry. The workers demanded Setiadi to resign. The demand was made because of the military screening team inside each ministry at that time made allegations that Setiadi gave support to Central All-Indonesian Workers Organization and his activity in the Association of Indonesian College Students (HSI, Himpunan Sarjana Indonesia). His ministry was also criticized for its alleged miscoordination with the Ministry of Irrigation during the construction of the power station in Jatiluhur Dam.

On 18 March 1966, Setiadi along with other 14 ministers including Subandrio (First Deputy Prime Minister), Chaerul Saleh (Third Deputy Prime Minister), A. Astrawinata(Minister of Justice), Oei Tjoe Tat (State Minister), Achadi (Minister of Transmigration/ Cooperatives) and Jusuf Muda Dalam (Governor of Indonesia Central Bank) was arrested by the Suharto's regime after the 30 September Movement due to their loyalty to Sukarno. Setiadi was imprisoned in the Nirbaya Detention Centre without any proper trial. He was freed on 20 December 1977 after being imprisoned for almost 12 years. However, after he was freed, the Lurah (community head) of Menteng refused to give him a permanent identity card. The Governor of Jakarta at that time, Ali Sadikin, intervened and instructed the Lurah to visit Setiadi and give him the permanent identity card.

== Later life ==
After the fall of Suharto, Setiadi, along with other political prisoners from Suharto's regime, such as Ir. Muhammad Sanusi, J.K Tumakaka, Soetomo Martopradoto and Nyonya Jo Koerwet formed the Association of New Order Victims (PAKORBA, Paguyuban Korban Orde Baru). Setadi became a leading member of the organization and the chief editor of the Mimbar PAKORBA, the organization's publication.

As a member of PAKORBA, Setiadi advocated for the rehabilitation of New Order regime's victims. On 5 April 2003, Setiadi went to Geneva to testify about the Indonesian mass killings of 1965–66 in front of the United Nations High Commissioner for Human Rights.

When asked about the impact of Suharto's death to him and his fellow ex-detainees of the 30 September Movement, Setiadi was unoptimistic and stated that it won't affect him due to the sheer number of politicians who had not changed their mindset. He stated that a lot of Indonesian laws had to be repealed in order for the ex-detainees to get their full rights.

Setiadi died at 10.05 on 28 July 2010 on his house in Menteng, Jakarta. Setiadi was buried a day later in the Kalibata Heroes' Cemetery.
