= Jong Batak Bond =

Intellectual organisation in the Dutch East Indies

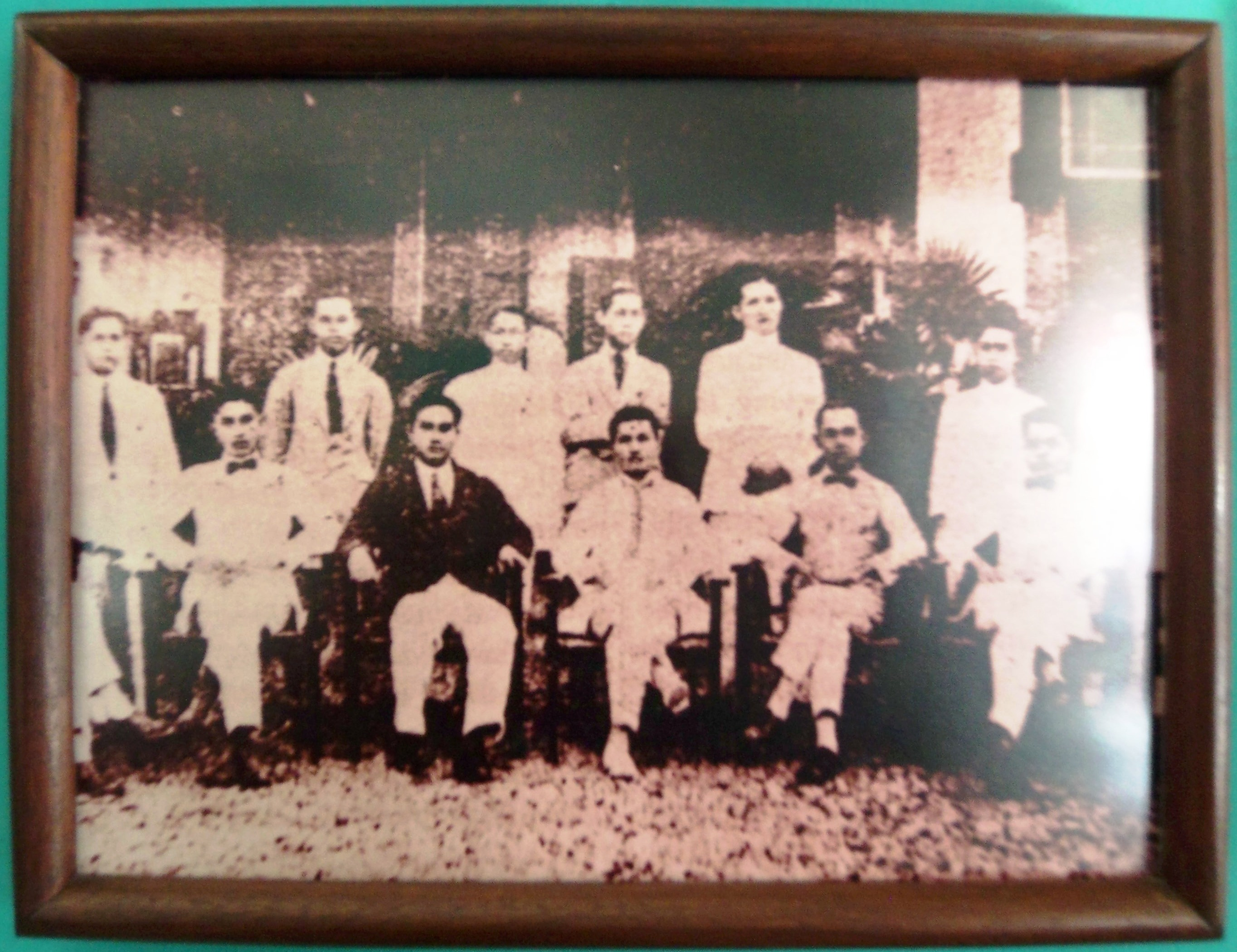
The Jong Batak delegation at the Second Indonesian Youth Conference in 1928

Jong Batak Bond (Dutch for "young Batak association"), sometimes simply called Jong Batak, was a short-lived but influential Batak intellectual organization founded in Batavia, Dutch East Indies (today Jakarta) in December 1925. Like Budi Utomo, Jong Java and other such organizations, its members consisted of native Indonesian students in Dutch-language schools interested in advancing their ethnic group and Indonesian nationalism at the same time. Notable members of the group include Amir Sjarifuddin Harahap, Todung Sutan Gunung Mulia Harahap, Sanusi Pane, Saleh Said Harahap and Arifin Harahap.

Members of the organization represented by Sjarifuddin Harahap participated in the 1928 Youth Pledge which is considered to be one of the major events in the development of the Indonesian nationalist movement. By 1930 Jong Batak, and most of the other "ethnic" associations, had merged into the pan-Indonesian group founded by Sukarno, Indonesia Muda.

== History ==
Jong Batak was founded at a meeting in Batavia on 6 December 1925 by a group of Batak students from secondary schools; the founding meeting was chaired by Volksraad member Todung Sutan Gunung Mulia. The impetus to create the group had come from disaffected Batak members of the nationalist organization Jong Sumatranen Bond who decided to leave that organization because they felt it was dominated by its Minangkabau members. Led by Djabangoen Harahap, Ferdinand Lumban Tobing, and Sanusi Pane, this new group hoped to discuss, study, and modernize Batak culture, which at that time had a very low status in Indies society. However, it mainly became popular among the Toba Batak people; other closely related groups such as the Karo and Mandailing did not use the Batak label at that time and were less interested in this group.

A major function of Jong Batak seems to have been a social one; Batak students in major cities in Java and Sumatra used it to organize football leagues, chess clubs, social gatherings and nature walks. The association also published its own newspaper in Weltevreden starting in January 1926, titled Jong Batak: orgaan van den Bataks Bond. It is unclear how long that publication existed; it appears to have published until 1929.

From 30 April to 2 May 1926 members of Jong Batak participated in the First Indonesian Youth Congress in Weltevreden led by Mohammad Tabrani. A major proposal of the conference was to merge all of the ethnic youth associations into one pan-Indonesian group, but that conference failed to attract all the major Indonesian youth groups and was considered unsuccessful. The youth groups continued to meet in 1927 to try and sort out their differences to create a unified organization, including at a conference hosted by Sukarno in Bandung in December where he called for the creation of a Young Indonesia (Indonesia Muda) association. At the follow-up Second Indonesian Youth Conference which took place two year later, on 26–28 October 1928, Amir Sjarifuddin Harahap represented Jong Batak and participated in the famous Youth Pledge, considered a key moment in the development of the Indonesian national movement. Their participation in the conference signaled a greater cooperation between the youth associations, aiming at an eventual merger into one organization.

Because of the increasing strength of Indonesian nationalism, during 1930–1 Jong Batak was dissolved along with Jong Java and other comparable organizations, and its members joined Indonesia Muda (young Indonesia, known in Dutch as Jong-Indonesië) instead.

== Legacy ==
The successful Jong Batak chess club continued to compete for several years after the dissolution of the parent organization.

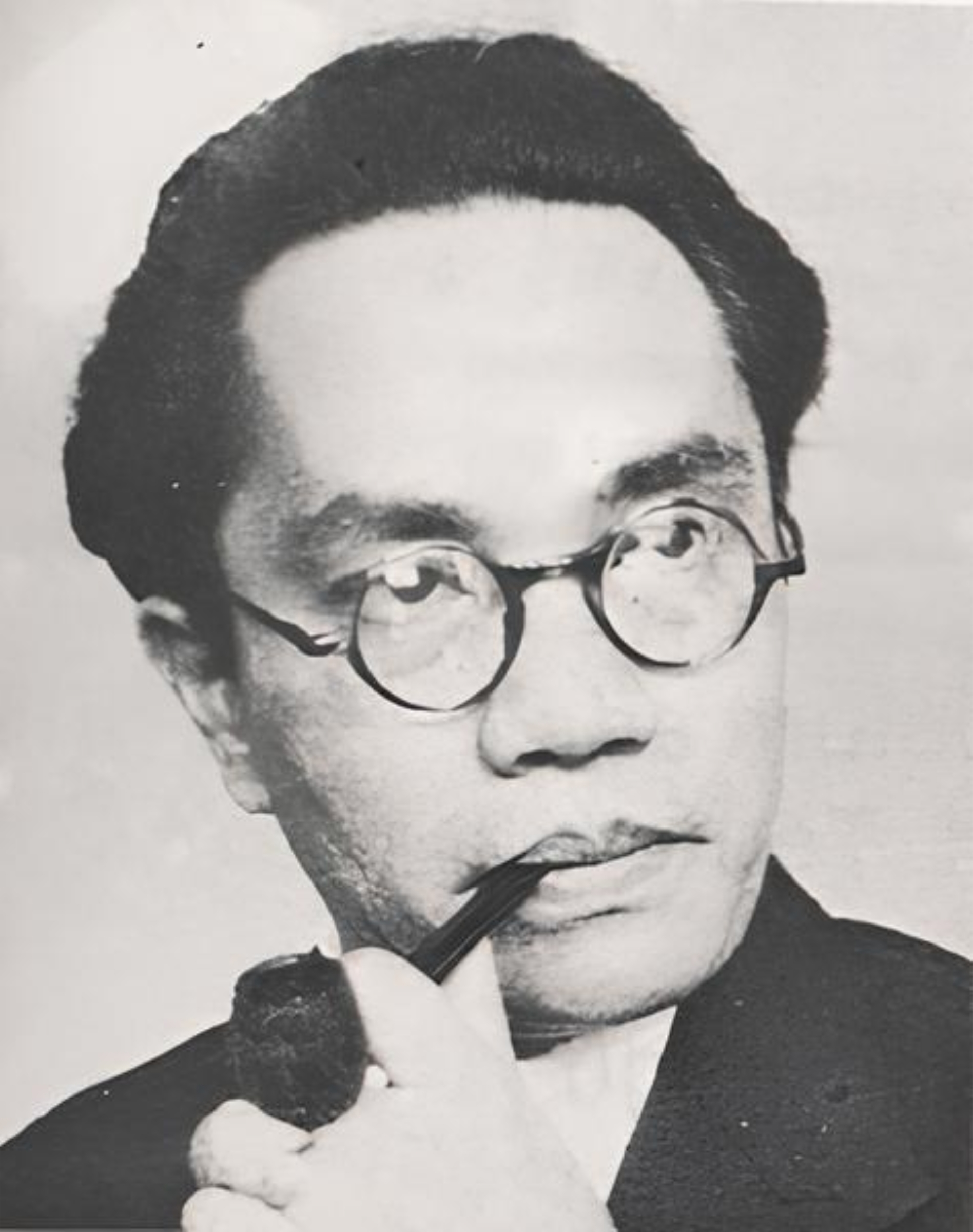
Amir Sjarifoeddin in 1946

Although the organization was short-lived, many of the members and leaders of Jong Batak went on to become influential in the Indonesian nationalist movement and in politics after Indonesia gained its independence in the 1940s. Sanusi Pane became one of the most famous Indonesian writers and a schoolteacher. Amir Sjarifuddin Harahap became Indonesian Minister of Defence in 1945, and Prime Minister from June 1947 to January 1948. Todung Sutan Gunung Mulia, Sjarifuddin's cousin, had been a Volksraad member during colonial times and was Minister of Education and Culture from 1945–6 and was also involved in the founding of the Indonesian Christian Party. Arifin Harahap, another former member, was Trade Minister from 1959 to 1962.

An annual arts festival held in Medan, North Sumatra since 2014 took inspiration from the group and is called the Jong Bataks Art Festival.
