= Todung =

Todung is a masculine given name. Notable people with the name include:

- Todung Mulya Lubis, Indonesian lawyer and activist
- Todung Sutan Gunung Mulia (1896–1966), Indonesian educator, politician, and church organizer
