= Setyadjit Soegondo =

Indonesian politician (1907–1948)

Raden Mas Setyadjit Soegondo
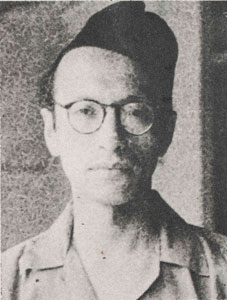
- Setyadjit Soegondo in 1947

1st Deputy Prime Minister of Indonesia
- In office 3 July 1947 – 23 January 1948 Co-leading with Adnan Kapau Gani, Samsoeddin and Wondoamiseno
- Prime Minister: Amir Sjarifoeddin

Member of the Dutch House of Representatives
- In office 20 November 1945 – 4 June 1946

Personal details
- Born: Raden Mas Setyadjit Soegondo; 7 June 1907 Dengon, Dutch East Indies
- Died: October 1948 (aged 41) Madiun, Indonesia
- Party: Communist Party of Holland (1930s); Independent (1945–1946); PBI (1946–1948); PKI (1948)
- Education: Technical College of Delft

Raden Mas Setyadjit Soegondo (7 June 1907 – October 1948) was an Indonesian student leader and politician. From 1933 to 1946, Setyadjit was chairman of the Indonesian student organization in the Netherlands Perhimpoenan Indonesia, and participated in the Dutch resistance during World War II. He subsequently was a member of the Dutch House of Representatives from 1945 to 1946 as an independent. Upon returning to Indonesia, he became leader of the Labour Party of Indonesia (Partai Buruh Indonesia; PBI), served as junior minister of Transport in the Third Sjahrir Cabinet and as deputy prime minister of Indonesia from July 1947 to January 1948 in the First and Second Amir Sjarifuddin Cabinet. In 1948, Setyadjit participated in the Madiun affair, and was subsequently executed after the uprising was suppressed.

== Early life ==
Setyadjit Soegondo was born on 7 June 1907 in Dengon in the Dutch East Indies. He was of royal descent. After completing his education in Soerabaja, Setyadjit moved to the European Netherlands in 1927.

In 1928 and 1929, he studied economics in Berlin, after which he attended the Technical College of Delft. In 1931 Setyadjit worked together with Roestam Effendi for the communist newspaper De Tribune. Setyadjit joined the Communist Party of Holland, and succeeded Roestam Effendi as chair of the Indonesian student organization Perhimpoenan Indonesia (PI) in 1933. During this period, Setyadjit was part of a group of PI members who sought to push the organization towards a more pro-communist path. From 1935 to 1937, Setyadjit spent time in Switzerland due to illness, temporarily laying down his duties as chairman. In the late 1930s, Setyadjit moved closer to cooperation with the Social Democratic Workers' Party (SDAP), as part of the communist popular front strategy of that period, and was allowed to speak at SDAP meetings. In August 1939, Setyadjit was the PI representative to a congress of the World Student Association in Paris.

== World War II ==
In early 1940, Setyadjit declared World War II to be a "war of the imperialists to conquer the world." In the first issue of Perhimpoenan Indonesia's newsletter following the German invasion of the Netherlands, Setyadjit aligned himself with the Comintern line around this period, proclaiming that the war was part of a Dutch plot to keep the Dutch East Indies in its grasp, and that the Indonesian people had "absolutely no reason to be enemies to [...] the German people]]. He would gradually walk back these opinions in later years. Setyadjit and PI would fully turn against the Germans after all non-National Socialist political groups were banned in the summer of 1941, while maintaining their long-term goal of Indonesian independence.

During the German occupation of the Netherlands, Setyadjit was active in the Dutch resistance. In November 1940, Setyadjit took part in a strike at the Technical College of Delft following the firing of Jewish professors. Setyadjit would spend much of the war leading Perhimpoenan Indonesia from hiding in the Jordaan neighborhood of Amsterdam. He also represented the organization in its contacts with other resistance groups, served as editor of the illegal leftist newspaper De Vrije Katheder, and contributed anonymous articles about Indonesian affairs to other illegal newspapers such as Het Parool, Vrij Nederland and De Waarheid. In 1944, Setyadjit served as the Indonesian representative in the Indies Section of the General Advisory Council, a Dutch resistance advisory council on the liberation of the Dutch East Indies, led by Willem Schermerhorn. In May 1945, he became the section's secretary.

Following the end of World War II, Setyadjit, as leader of Perhimpoenan Indonesia, participated in liberation festivities in Amsterdam and met Prince Bernhard in May 1945. He was awarded one of the seats that had previously belonged to representatives of the National Socialist Movement (NSB). Together with Mohamed Nazir Datoek Pamontjak in the Senate, he was one of two representatives of Perhimpoenan Indonesia in the Dutch parliament. As an MP, Setyadjit sat as an independent, and did not speak a single time. Along with PI as a whole, Setyadjit had become much more accomodationist during World War II, allowing for the possibility of maintaining ties with the Netherlands with the hope they might be allowed to lead an autonomous Indonesia following its liberation. Setyadjit faced increasing opposition as secretary of the , both from the more conservative resistance group around the newspaper Trouw which refused to work with communists as well as members of Perhimpoenan Indonesia, who preferred negotiations with the new Indonesian Republic led by Sukarno. The Indies Section was dissolved on 20 March 1946. He was also an editor for Vrij Nederland, having been introduced to its head editor Henk van Randwijk in 1943 whom Setyadjit became close friends with.

In April, Setyadjit represented the Republic of Indonesia at the Hoge Veluwe conference, earning him the personal appreciation of Dutch prime minister Willem Schermerhorn, who along with many other Dutch figures considered Setyadjit one of the key figures of the Indonesian nationalist movement. At the conference, Setyadjit agreed to a federal Indonesia in union with the Netherlands, but the plans soon fell apart. Setyadjit left the House of Representatives in July 1946, returning to Indonesia together with the Indonesian delegation to the Hoge Veluwe conference.

== Indonesia ==
Upon his return to Indonesia, Setyadjit, who was aligned politically with figures in the Communist Party of Indonesia (PKI), and Amir Sjarifuddin, joined the Labour Party of Indonesia (Partai Buruh Indonesia; PBI). In August 1946, Setyadjit was elected into the party's executive, becoming the PBI's vice-chairman,. and its chairman by April 1947. Setyadjit was junior minister of Transportation in the Third Sjahrir Cabinet from 2 November 1946 to 3 July 1947. In 1947, Setyadit was appointed as one of several formateurs by Sukarno to form a new government, which led to the forming of the First Amir Sjarifuddin Cabinet, in which Setyadjit became a deputy prime minister. The PBI under Setyadjit supported the Linggadjati Agreement, which led to a group within the party splitting off to found the Free Labour Party (Partai Buruh Merdeka). Setyadjit also faced allegations from ideological opponents of being a Dutch agent due to his role in the Dutch resistance and support for the Linggadjati Agreement.

In August 1948, Setyadjit was one of several Indonesian leftist political figures to reveal he had been a long-time member of the Communist Party of Indonesia (PKI). The PBI was subsequently merged into the PKI, with only around half its membership being allowed to join the PKI. At a meeting on 26 and 27 August, Setyadjit joined the PKI's politburo. Setyadjit arrived in Madiun together with fellow PKI member Wikana on 17 September, and took a leading part in the subsequent Madiun Affair, setting up the Government of the National Front of Madiun. At a meeting of the leadership of the People's Democratic Front (FDR), Setyadjit spoke on political matters, and was sent out to the region around Kediri. While the revolt was initially successful, managing to capture Madiun, it was soon defeated by the Sukarno-aligned Siliwangi Division, which recaptured Madiun on 28 September.

Setyadjit's ultimate fate is unknown, though a telegram from Australian diplomat Tom Critchley places the date of his execution on 10 October 1948. Other unverified sources report he died from tuberculosis or that he was living in Beijing under an assumed name in 1950.

== Bibliography ==
- F.J.F.M. Duynstee; J. Bosmans (1977). Parlementaire geschiedenis van Nederland na 1945, deel 1, Het kabinet-Schermerhorn-Drees (1945-1946) (PDF). Van Gorcum. p. 5. ISBN 90-232-1412-9.
- Foray, Jennifer L. (2011). Visions of Empire in the Nazi-Occupied Netherlands. Cambridge University Press. ISBN 978-1107015807.
- Poeze, Harry A. (1986). In het land van de overheerser: I: Indonesiërs in Nederland 1600-1950 (in Dutch). Dordrecht, Netherlands; Cinnaminson, United States: Foris Publications. ISBN 9067652016.
- Poeze, Harry A. (2007-01-01). Verguisd en vergeten. Tan Malaka, de linkse beweging en de Indonesische Revolutie, 1945-1949 (in Dutch). Leiden: Brill. ISBN 978-90-04-25403-9.
- Stutje, Klaas (2016-06-15). Behind the Banner of Unity: Nationalism and anticolonialism among Indonesian students in Europe, 1917-1931. Amsterdam: University of Amsterdam.
