= Second Amir Sjarifuddin Cabinet =

Sixth Indonesian Cabinet

Second Amir Sjarifuddin Cabinet Kabinet Amir Sjarifuddin II
- 6th Cabinet of Indonesia
- 1947–1948
- Date formed: 11 November 1947
- Date dissolved: 29 January 1948

People and organisations
- Head of state: Sukarno
- Head of government: Amir Sjarifuddin
- No. of ministers: 32 ministers
- Member party: PS; Masyumi; PSII; PBI; PNI; Parkindo; PKI; People's Youth; BTI; Catholic; Independent

History
- Predecessor: Amir Sjarifuddin I Cabinet
- Successor: Hatta I Cabinet

The Second Amir Sjarifuddin Cabinet (Indonesian: Kabinet Amir Sjarifuddin II) was Indonesia's sixth cabinet and was the result of a reshuffle to allow for the entry of the Masyumi Party, which gained five posts. The cabinet lasted only two months and eleven days, from 11 November 1947 to 29 January 1948, after Masyumi withdrew its ministers in protest at the Renville Agreement the government signed with the Dutch.

== Composition ==
Following the 11 November reshuffle, the composition of the new cabinet was announced in a meeting of the Working Committee of the Central Indonesian National Committee, which at the time served as the legislature. The cabinet was inaugurated at midday on 12 November.

=== Cabinet Leadership ===
- Prime Minister: Amir Sjarifuddin (Socialist Party)
- First Deputy Prime Minister: Samsoeddin (Masyumi Party)
- Second Deputy Prime Minister: W. Wondoamiseno (Indonesian Islamic Union Party - PSII)
- Third Deputy Prime Minister: Setyadjit Soegondo (PBI)
- Fourth Deputy Prime Minister: Adnan Kapau Gani (Indonesian National Party - PNI)

=== Departmental Ministers ===
- Minister of Home Affairs: Mohammad Roem (Masjumi)
- Minister of Foreign Affairs: Agus Salim
- Minister of Welfare: Adnan Kapau Gani (PSII)
- Minister of Defense: Amir Sjarifuddin (Socialist Party)
- Minister of Education: Ali Sastroamidjojo (Indonesian National Party - PNI)
- Minister of Finance: A. A. Maramis (PNI)
- Minister of Information: Sjahboedin Latif (PSII)
- Minister of Transportation: Djuanda
- Minister of Public Works: Herling Laoh (PNI)
- Minister of Health: Johannes Leimena (Parkindo)
- Minister of Social Affairs: Soeprodjo (PBI)
- Minister of Justice: Soesanto Tirtoprodjo (PNI)
- Minister of Religious Affairs: Masjkoer (Masyumi)
- Minister of Labor: S. K. Trimurti (PBI)

=== State Ministers (without portfolio) ===
- State Minister: Sri Sultan Hamengkubuwana IX
- State Minister: Maroeto Darusman (Communist Party of Indonesia - PKI)
- State Minister: Anwar Tjokroaminoto (Masyumi)

=== State Ministers ===
- State Minister of Youth Affairs: Wikana (Youth Congress Board)
- State Minister of Provisions: Sujas (Indonesian Peasants Front)
- State Minister of Mixed Ethnicity Affairs: Siauw Giok Tjhan
- State Minister of Police Affairs: Hindromartono (Socialist Party)

=== Junior Ministers ===
- Junior Minister of Home Affairs: Abdul Madjid Djojoadiningrat (Socialist Party)
- Junior Minister of Foreign Affairs: Tamzil (Socialist Party)
- Junior Minister of Justice: Kasman Singodimedjo (Masyumi)
- First Junior Minister of Welfare : Ignatius J. Kasimo (PKRI)
- Second Junior Minister of Welfare: Adjidarmo Tjokronegoro (Socialist Party)
- Junior Minister of Defense: Arudji Kartawinata (PSII)
- Junior Minister of Finance: Ong Eng Die (Socialist Party)
- Junior Minister of Information: Ir. Setiadi Reksoprodjo (Socialist Party)
- Junior Minister of Health: Satrio (PBI)
- Junior Minister of Social Affairs: Sukotjo Wirjosapitro (PSII)
- Junior Minister of Labor: Wilopo (PNI)

== End of the cabinet ==
Masjumi was unhappy with the composition of the cabinet form the outset, feeling it did not represent a real move to an all-inclusive cabinet. Realizing the government was about to sign the Renville Agreement with the Dutch, Masjumi withdrew from the cabinet in protest on 16 January 1948. After the agreement was signed the following day, the PNI also withdrew its support for Prime Minister Amir Sjarifuddin, who resigned on 23 January.
