= Mohamad Isa =

Indonesian politician

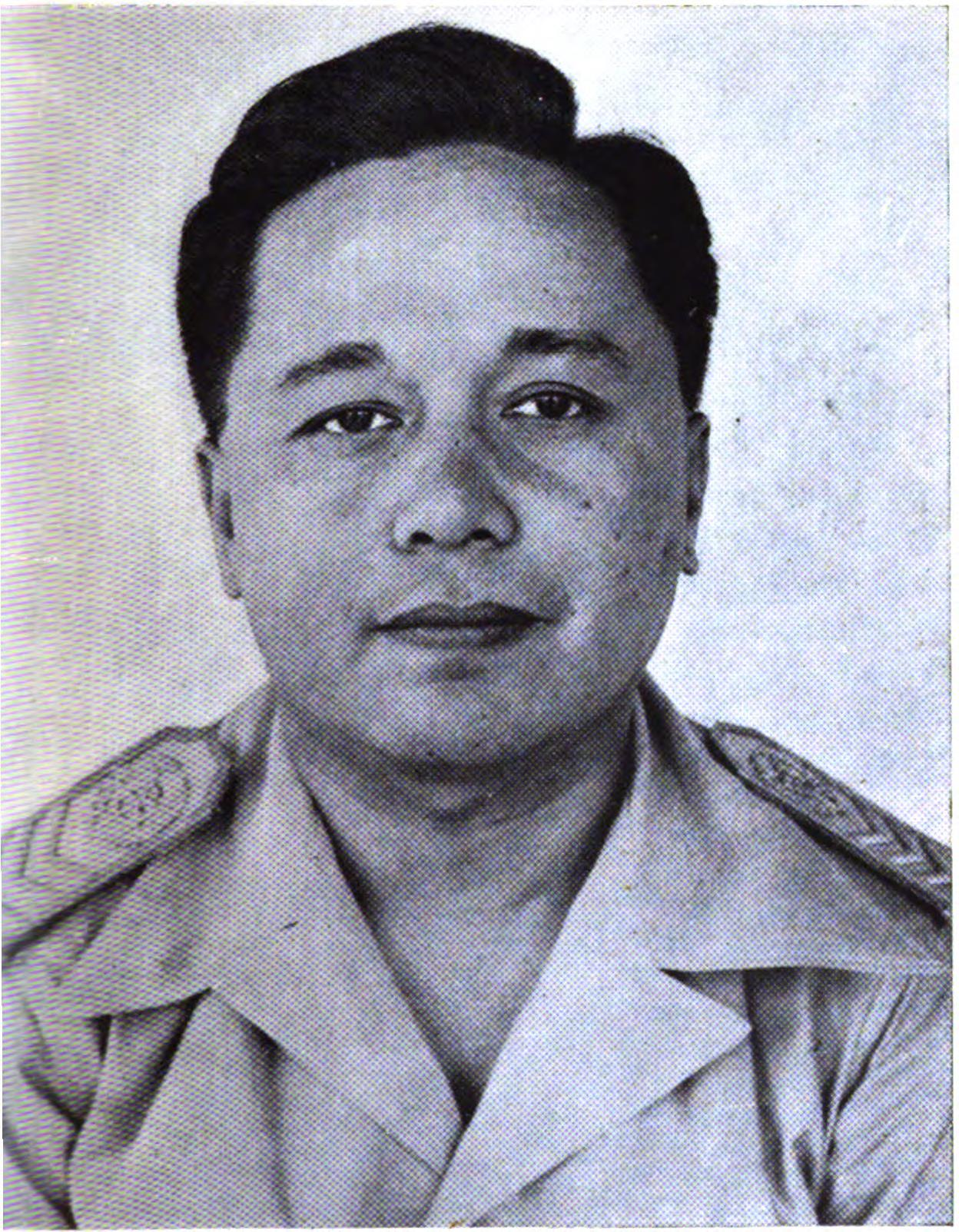

Member of the People's Consultative Assembly
- In office 15 September 1960 – 20 October 1966
- President: Sukarno

Member of the People's Representative Council
- In office 24 March 1956 – 2 May 1964
- President: Sukarno

Governor of South Sumatra
- In office 25 June 1948 – 1 August 1954
- Preceded by: Himself (as the Junior Governor of South Sumatra)
- Succeeded by: Winarno Danuatmodjo

Junior Governor of South Sumatra
- In office 16 October 1946 – 25 June 1948
- President: Sukarno
- Preceded by: Adnan Kapau Gani
- Succeeded by: Himself (as the Governor of South Sumatra)

Resident of Palembang
- In office May 1946 – 1 January 1947
- President: Sukarno
- Governor: Teuku Muhammad Hasan
- Preceded by: Adnan Kapau Gani
- Succeeded by: Abdulrozak

Personal details
- Born: 4 June 1909 Binjai, Deli Serdang, Dutch East Indies
- Died: 7 November 1979 (aged 70) Jakarta, Indonesia
- Party: Indonesian National Party
- Spouse: Siti Zainab (m. 1928)
- Children: 3, including Sjamsidar
- Parents: Datuk Haji Ismail (father); Zainab (mother)

Mohamad Isa (4 June 1909 — 7 November 1979) was a dentist, politician, and academician who served as the first governor of South Sumatra, member of the People's Representative Council and People's Consultative Assembly, and as the first rector of the Sriwijaya University.

== Early life ==
Mohamad Isa was born on 4 June 1909 in Binjai, as the fourth of twelve children. His father, Datuk Haji Ismail, was a Penghulu Pekan (market tradition chief). His mother, Zainab, was one of Ismail's wives. Ismail originally had several wives, but only Zainab bore children. As a Penghulu Pekan, Ismail taught his children, including Mohamad Isa, about the basics of Muslim teachings and Quran recitation.

After his graduation from the HIS (Hollandsch-Inlandsche School) and MULO (Meer Uitgebreid Lager Onderwijs), he asked permission from his father for continuing his studies at the AMS (Algemene Middlebare School, high school) in Batavia. At first, Ismail was reluctant to permit Mohamad Isa to study there, but eventually, he agreed and Mohamad Isa departed to Batavia. During his time in the AMS, he was involved in youth movements, such as the JIB (Jong Islamieten Bond, Union of Young Muslims) and NIPV (Vereeniging Nederlandsch Indische Padvinders, Dutch East Indies Scouts Association).

After finishing his studies at the AMS in Batavia, Mohamad Isa planned to study at STOVIT (School tot Opleiding van Indische Tandartsen, School for Training Indies Dentists). At that time, STOVIT was the first and only dental school in the Dutch East Indies. Mohamad Isa moved from Batavia to Surabaya along with Siti Ramelan, his newly married wife. For his proficient academic skills, Mohamad Isa, alongside 20 other students, was accepted to study at the university. One of his classmates was Moestopo, who would later become the National Hero of Indonesia. During his time in the school, Mohamad Isa actively participated in political movements. In 1935, Mohamad Isa joined the newly formed Great Indonesia Party, a political party formed by Soetomo as a result of a merger between the Budi Utomo political society and the Indonesian National Union. He also joined the Indonesia Muda youth organization, which was formed on 31 December 1930 as a fusion between various ethnic youth movements.

Due to his academic achievements in the STOVIT, Mohamad Isa was appointed an assistant to one of the lecturers in STOVIT after his graduation. Two years later, in 1938, Mohamad Isa resigned from his position in STOVIT and decided to open a dental clinic in Palembang.

== Dental career ==
After his resignation from STOVIT, Mohamad Isa traveled from Surabaya to Palembang. From Surabaya, Mohamad Isa and his family took a train to Batavia. From Batavia, they boarded a ship at the Port of Tanjung Priok and traveled to the Port of Boom Baru in Palembang. Following his arrival, he settled on a house and established a dental clinic in Palembang. At that time, there was no other dental clinic in Palembang except Mohamad Isa's clinic. Mohamad Isa's clinic would remain the only dental clinic in Palembang until the 1950s. However, Mohamad Isa never fixed the price for his dental service, and he became popular in the city.

In Palembang, Mohamad Isa met with Adnan Kapau Gani. Like Mohamad Isa, Gani was also an immigrant in the city. Gani introduced Mohamad Isa to the various pro-Indonesian political movements and parties in the city, such as the Indonesian National Party, Great Indonesia Party, Great Indonesia Movement, and the Indonesian Islamic Union Party. As a member of the Great Indonesia Party, Mohamad Isa was often invited to speak at political meetings between the parties.

== Japanese occupation ==
On 14 February 1942, the Japanese forces launched a sudden attack on Palembang. Palembang was fully occupied by the Japanese on 16 February 1942, and the Dutch East Indies government surrendered to the Japanese on 9 March 1942. Sukarno, the leader of the nationalist movement, had been freed by the Japanese from his exile in Bengkulu and was brought to Padang.

As the leader of the Great Indonesia Party in Palembang, Mohamad Isa went into discussion with other political leaders, such as Adnan Kapau Gani, Nungtjik A.R., and A.S. Sumadi from Gerindo. They planned to pick up Sukarno in Padang and bring him to Palembang. The plan succeeded, and they held a discussion with Sukarno about ways to face the Japanese. It was decided that anti-Japanese political activists would be divided into two groups. The first group would pretend to cooperate with the Japanese, while the second group would organize underground resistance against the Japanese.

Although Mohamad Isa organized underground resistance against the Japanese, his job as a dentist made him unsuspicious to the Japanese. Mohamad Isa was appointed the daily chairman of the Shu Shangi Kai (city council) of Palembang and as the advisor to the Sangyobu (Department of Company, Industry, and Handicraft).

One of Mohamad Isa's activities during this period was actively encouraging healthy and able-bodied South Sumatran youths to join the Gyugun, a voluntary semi-military organization formed by the Japanese. Mohamad Isa's campaign resulted in a success, as about 6,000 South Sumatran youth joined Gyugun. Members of the Gyugun would later form the embryo of the Indonesian armed forces in South Sumatra.

Following the defeat of Japan in the Pacific War, the Japanese formed the Committee for the Preparation of Independence in South Sumatra. Mohamad Isa became one of its members. The committee first met on 7 August 1945 and discussed the fundamentals for independence.

== CEO of PERMIRI ==
Japan officially surrendered on 15 August 1945, and Indonesia declared its independence two days later. On the morning of 23 August 1945, Adnan Kapau Gani held a meeting to discuss the post-independence government of South Sumatra. Mohamad Isa, who attended the meeting, held office as the head of the oil and mining affairs in South Sumatra. In his capacity as the head of the oil and mining affairs, Mohamad Isa was appointed the CEO of PERMIRI (Perusahaan Minyak Republik Indonesia, Oil Company of the Republic of Indonesia). PERMIRI was the first oil company in Indonesia that was managed by Indonesians. PERMIRI was established by Adnan Kapau Gani and operated leftover oil refineries in South Sumatra, which was previously owned by NIAM (Nederlansch Indie Aardolie Maatschappij) and BPM (Bataafsche Petroleum Maatschappij), both of which were Dutch East Indies era oil companies. Mohamad Isa's main task as the CEO was to repair the oil refineries in Plaju (previously owned by BPM) and Gerong River (previously owned by NIAM). Both refineries suffered heavy damages due to the bombing campaign conducted by the Allies in 1944.

Mohamad Isa's first instruction as the CEO was to establish a small oil refinery facility in Kenten. The oil refinery facility in this area was supplied by oil pipelines around the region. Soon after, branches of PERMIRI was established in Prabumulih and Pendopo. PERMIRI's oil refineries were maintained by students from the Oil Engineering School in Plaju.

PERMIRI later constructed oil refineries in Kenali Asam, Jambi. The oil refineries in Kenali Asam became the first in Indonesia to produce jet fuel. An experiment for the usage of Kenali Asam jet fuel was conducted in March 1948, when an Indonesian owned Avro Anson landed in Jambi for refueling. The experiment succeeded as the plane managed to fly without any technical difficulties. Since then, Kenali Asam jet fuel was exported to other refueling sites in Indonesia.

Under Mohamad Isa's instruction, PERMIRI expanded to other oil sites in South Sumatra. PERMIRI established oil refineries in Prabumulih, Keluang, Angit River, Banyuasin, Tanjung Enim, Pendopo, and Talang Akar. However, following the commencement of Operation Product, Mohamad Isa instructed PERMIRI employees to destroy the oil refineries to prevent the Dutch from using it.

== Chairman of Indonesian National Committee of Palembang ==
After the proclamation of Indonesian Independence on 17 August 1945, the Indonesians formed the Central Indonesian National Committee to act as an advisory body. Shortly afterwards, similar committees were formed throughout Indonesia. In Palembang, the city formed the Indonesian National Committee of Palembang on 3 September 1945. The committee, which consisted of 40 members, was led by Mohamad Isa.

As the chairman of Indonesian National Committee of Palembang, Mohamad Isa was entrusted to negotiate with the Japanese. He also instructed the creation of Indonesian National Committees for regencies under Palembang.

Due to the provisional nature of the Indonesian National Committee, the committee decided to replace itself with a permanent People's Representative Council. The committee initially wanted to held an election to fill the seats, but was cancelled due to unfavorable circumstances. As a replacement, the committee held the Palembang People's Congress in December 1945 to fill the seats. The congress was organized by Mohamad Isa, Nungtjik A.R. and Agus Rachman. Much to their surprise, about 1100 delegates from Palembang attended the congress. From these 1100 delegates, 60 of them were appointed into office.

In January 1946, the council held its first session. The session, which was led by Adnan Kapau Gani as the Resident of Palembang, decided to form a working body to run the day-to-day activities of the council. Mohamad Isa was elected as the chairman of the working body.

== Resident of Palembang ==
Five months after the first session of the People's Representative Council, Gani was appointed the Junior Governor of South Sumatra, leaving the office of Resident of Palembang vacant. Mohamad Isa was appointed the Resident of Palembang to replace Gani.

As the Resident of Palembang, Mohamad Isa frequently received diplomats and foreign correspondents in his office. Foreign correspondents usually interviewed Mohamad Isa to obtain first-hand information about the ongoing Indonesian National Revolution. Feris Yuarsa, Mohamad Isa's biographer, remarked that the visitations from Chinese, Indian, and United Kingdom diplomats helped reinforce the de facto recognition of Indonesia's statehood.

== Bibliography ==
- Yuarsa, Feris (24 September 2016), Koesoema, Gandjar Santosa (ed.), Mohamad Isa - Pejuang Kemerdekaan yang Visioner, Gramedia Pustaka Utama, ISBN 978-602-03-3392-2
- Ministry of Information (1954), Kami Perkenalkan [We Introduce] (PDF) (in Indonesian), Jakarta: Archipel Printers & Editors
- Information Bureau of South Sumatra (1954), Republik Indonesia: Propinsi Sumatera Selatan (PDF), Ministry of Information
- Kelly, Terence (1985), Battle for Palembang, London: Robert Hale, ISBN 978-0-7090-2378-4
- Vickers, Adrian (2005), A History Modern of Indonesia, Cambridge, ISBN 978-0-521-54262-3
- Kahin, George McTurnan (1952). Nationalism and Revolution in Indonesia. Ithaca, New York: Cornell University Press. ISBN 0-8014-9108-8.
