= Adnan Kapau Gani =

Indonesian politician and physician (1905–1968)

Major General (Tit.) Dr. Adnan Kapau-Gani
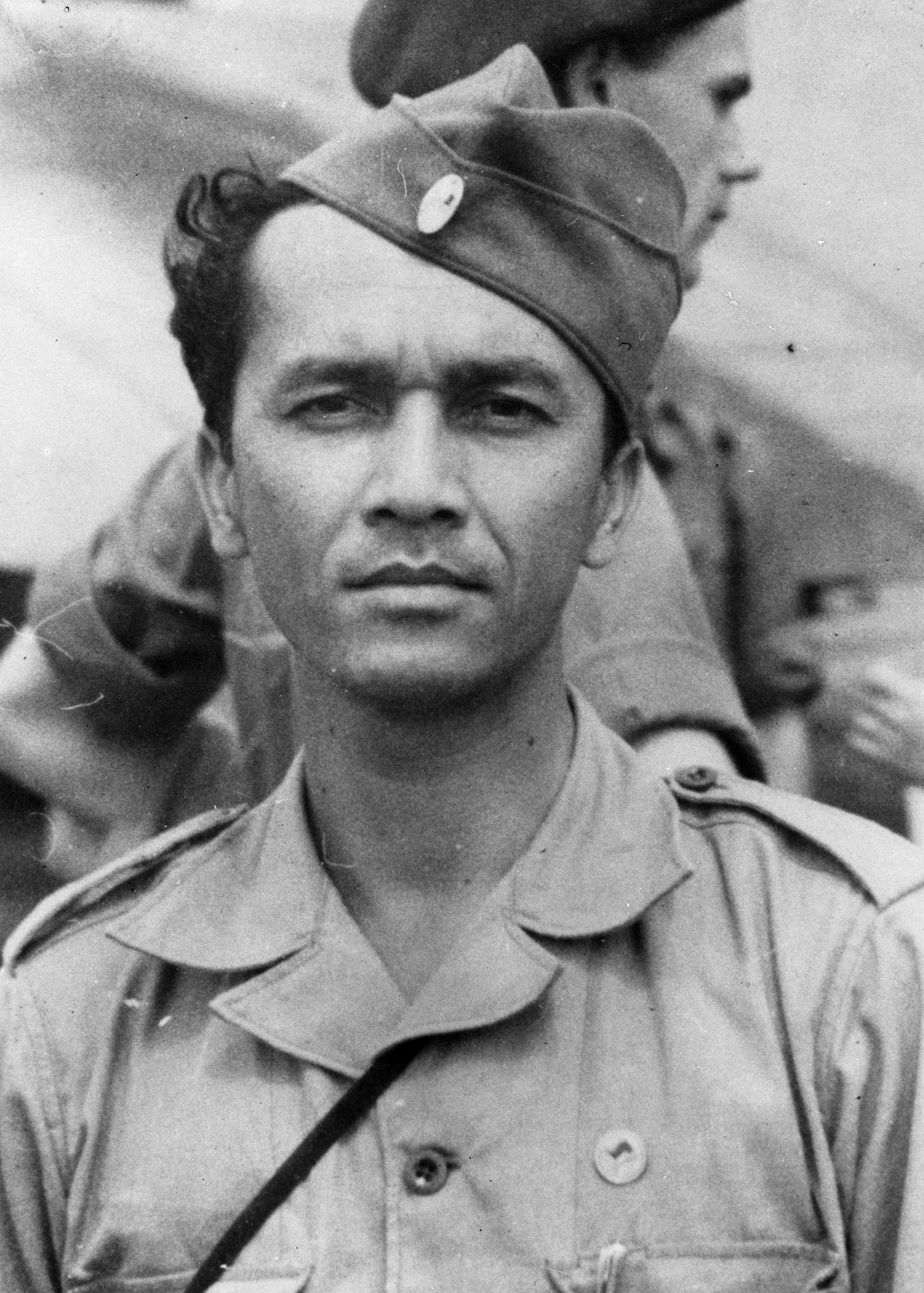
- A.K. Gani, c. 1947

1st Deputy Prime Minister of Indonesia
- In office 11 November 1947 – 29 Januari 1948 Co-leading with Setyadjit Soegondo, R. Syamsudin and Wondoamiseno
- President: Sukarno
- Prime Minister: Amir Sjarifoeddin
- Preceded by: Position established
- Succeeded by: Syafruddin Prawiranegara
- In office 3 July 1947 – 11 November 1947 Co-leading with Setyadjit Soegondo
- President: Sukarno
- Prime Minister: Amir Sjarifoeddin

7th Minister of Transportation
- In office 19 November 1954 – 24 July 1955
- President: Sukarno
- Prime Minister: Ali Sastroamidjojo
- Preceded by: Roosseno Soerjohadikoesoemo
- Succeeded by: Frits Laoh

3rd Minister of Welfare of Indonesia
- In office 2 October 1946 – 29 January 1948
- President: Sukarno
- Prime Minister: Sutan Sjahrir; Amir Sjarifoeddin
- Preceded by: Darmawan Mangunkusumo
- Succeeded by: Sjafruddin Prawiranegara

1st Governor of South Sumatra
- In office 1945–1946
- President: Sukarno
- Preceded by: Position established
- Succeeded by: Mohamad Isa

Personal details
- Born: 16 September 1905 Palembayan, Agam, Dutch East Indies
- Died: 23 December 1968 (aged 63) Palembang, South Sumatera, Indonesia
- Spouse: Masturah Kapau Gani
- Education: Geneeskundige Hoogeschool te Batavia; School tot Opleiding van Inlandsche Artsen
- Profession: Physician; Politician
- Awards: National Hero of Indonesia (2007)

Major General (Tit.) Dr. Adnan Kapau Gani or commonly abbreviated as A.K. Gani (16 September 1905 – 23 December 1968) was an Indonesian doctor, politician, actor and military figure. He served as Deputy Prime Minister in the Cabinet of Amir Sjarifuddin I and the Cabinet of Amir Sjarifuddin II.

== Early life ==
A.K. Gani was born in Palembayan, West Sumatra, west of Bukittinggi, on 16 September 1905. The son of a teacher, he finished his early studies in Bukittinggi in 1923 before going to Batavia (modern-day Jakarta), first for his secondary studies and then to study medicine. He graduated from STOVIA (Dutch: School tot Opleiding van Indische Artsen), a school for prospective doctors, in 1926.

Gani has been active in politics and social organisations since his teenage years. He was a member of several groups for native youth, including Jong Java and Jong Sumatera. By the late 1920s, he had several enterprises running, including a boarding house and book reseller. This revenue enabled him to donate funds to the Youth Congress of 1928, where the Youth Pledge was first read and "Indonesia Raya" (the national anthem of Indonesia) was first played; Gani also attended this conference. In 1931 he joined Partindo, which had split off from the Indonesian National Party (Partai Nasional Indonesia, or PNI) shortly after Sukarno's arrest by the colonial government. Gani became acquainted with Sukarno after the latter's release from prison the following year and joined the Indonesian Political Federation with him.

Long interested in theatre, in 1941 Gani starred in Union Film's Asmara Moerni after being invited by the film's director, Rd. Ariffien. At the time the country's film industry was beginning to cater to well-educated audiences. Although some of the audience considered Gani's involvement in Asmara Moerni as besmirching the independence movement, Gani considered it necessary to improve how the people viewed local productions. The film, the only one Gani ever made, was a commercial success. That year Gani received his medical degree.

After the Japanese occupied the Indies in 1942, Gani refused to collaborate. As such, he was arrested in September 1943 and held until October of the following year. He spent the rest of the occupation as a private practitioner.

== National revolution ==
After the country's independence and during the ensuing revolution, Gani gained greater political power while also serving in the military. From 1945 to 1947 he was the commissioner for the PNI in South Sumatra, also serving on the party's board. He also coordinated military efforts in the province. He considered Palembang a viable economic powerhouse for the newly independent nation, arguing that with oil they could gather international support. He negotiated sales with international interests, including the Dutch-owned Shell while smuggling weapons and military supplies past the Dutch blockade. He had numerous connections in the Chinese community in Singapore, which assisted him in these tasks.

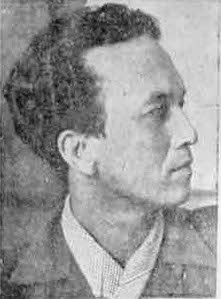
A.K. Gani, c. 1946

From 2 October 1946 until 27 June 1947 Gani served as Minister of Welfare under Sutan Sjahrir in the prime minister's third cabinet; Syahrir later remarked that he felt as if Gani had been imposed upon him by Sukarno, who was by then president. While serving as minister of welfare Gani, with Syahrir and Mohammad Roem, served as the Indonesian delegation to the third plenary session for the Linggarjati Agreement, becoming a signatory on 25 March 1947; the Dutch considered him undiplomatic and prone to showing his emotions. He also worked to establish a national banking network, the BTC, as well as several trade organisations. Gani was also elected as chairman of the Indonesian National Party in the March 1947 PNI congress, but due to the political situation, he was replaced by Sujono Hadinoto in November 1947.

With Amir Sjarifuddin and Setyadjit Soegondo, Gani was a formateur for the new cabinet, which received its mandate on 3 July. He stayed on as Minister of Welfare while also serving as a deputy prime minister under Sjarifuddin. Gani was the first cabinet member arrested during Operation Product, a Dutch assault on Indonesian-held territory in mid-July, but was later released. He also attended a trade conference in Havana, Cuba. In Sjarifuddin's second cabinet, Gani continued to serve as a deputy prime minister and minister of welfare until the cabinet collapsed on 29 January 1948 owing to dissatisfaction with the Renville Agreement.

== Post-revolution ==
After the revolution ended in 1949, Gani became the Military Governor of South Sumatra. In 1954, while still involved in politics as minister of transportation in the First Ali Sastroamidjojo Cabinet, he became the Chairman of the Council of Curators at Palembang State University (now Sriwijaya University); he remained active in Palembang until his death on 23 December 1968.

== Death ==
Gani died at Charitas Palembang Hospital on December 23, 1968 at the age of 63 years and his body was buried in the Ksatria Ksetra Siguntang Heroes Cemetery, Palembang. Gani left behind a wife, Masturah, and had no children until the end of his life.

== Awards ==
=== Titles and Honors Mark ===
To commemorate his services, on November 9, 2007 President Susilo Bambang Yudhoyono awarded the title National Hero of Indonesia to Adnan Kapau Gani. He received this title together with Slamet Rijadi, Ida Anak Agung Gde Agung, and Moestopo based on Presidential Decree Number 066/TK/2007. Apart from that, his name is also immortalized as the name of a hospital in Palembang, namely Dr. A.K. Gani and the names of roads in several cities in Indonesia. There is also the Dr. Museum. A.K. Gani which is located in Palembang City.

Adnan Kapau Gani was also awarded various honors. These honors include:

- "Guerrilla Star" 24 carat gold and the title of "Grand Guerrilla Leader" from the South Sumatra People's Representative Council.
- Certificate of Appreciation from the Chief of Army Staff.
- Honorary title of Veteran "Independence Fighter of the Republic of Indonesia" class "A" with 4 years and 4 months of service, NPV. 6,001,620.
- Award certificate and Struggle Medal for Class 45 from the General Chair of the National Daily Council.
- Star of Mahaputera, 2nd Class (Indonesian: Bintang Mahaputera Adipradana) (7 August 1995)
- Star of Guerilla (Indonesian: Bintang Gerilya) (17 Agustus 1955)
- Satyalancana Military Operation Movement I (Indonesian: Satyalancana Gerakan Operasi Militer I)
- Satyalancana Military Operation Movement II (Indonesian: Satyalancana Gerakan Operasi Militer II)

== Gallery ==
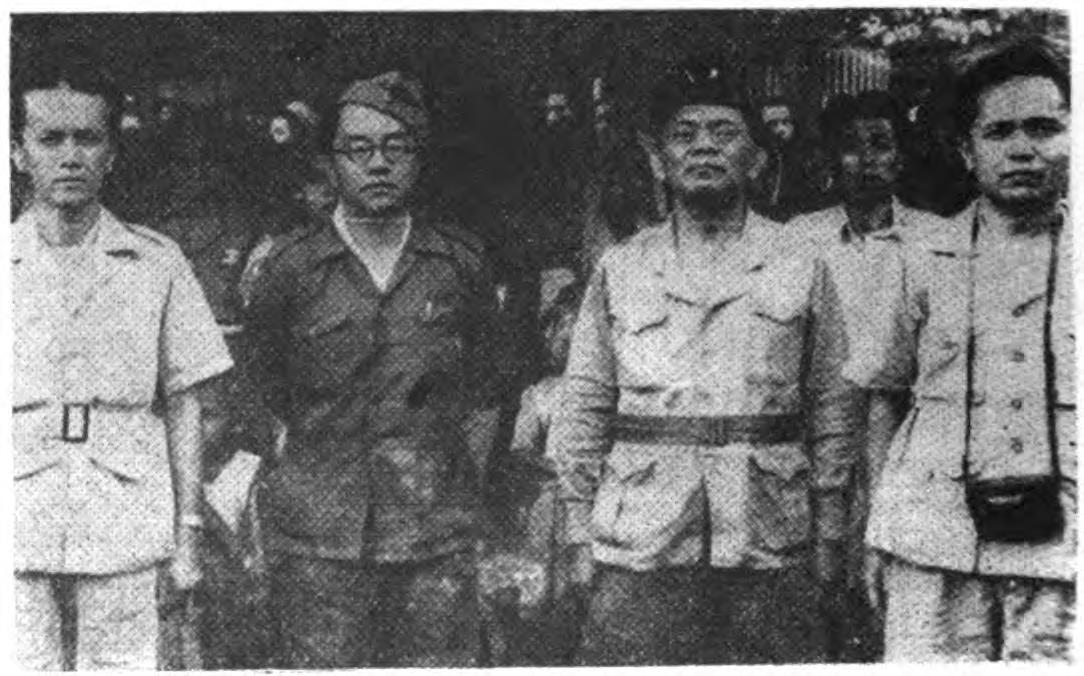
Dr. A.K. Gani, Amir Syarifuddin, Urip Sumohardjo, and Mohammad Isa at a meeting at the Palembang Grand Mosque

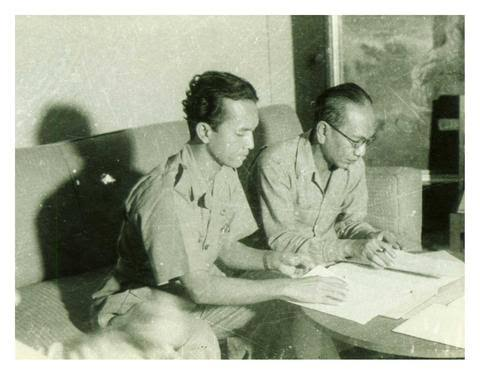
Dr. A.K Gani and representatives from Indonesia examining the Linggarjati Agreement in Jakarta, on November 15, 1946

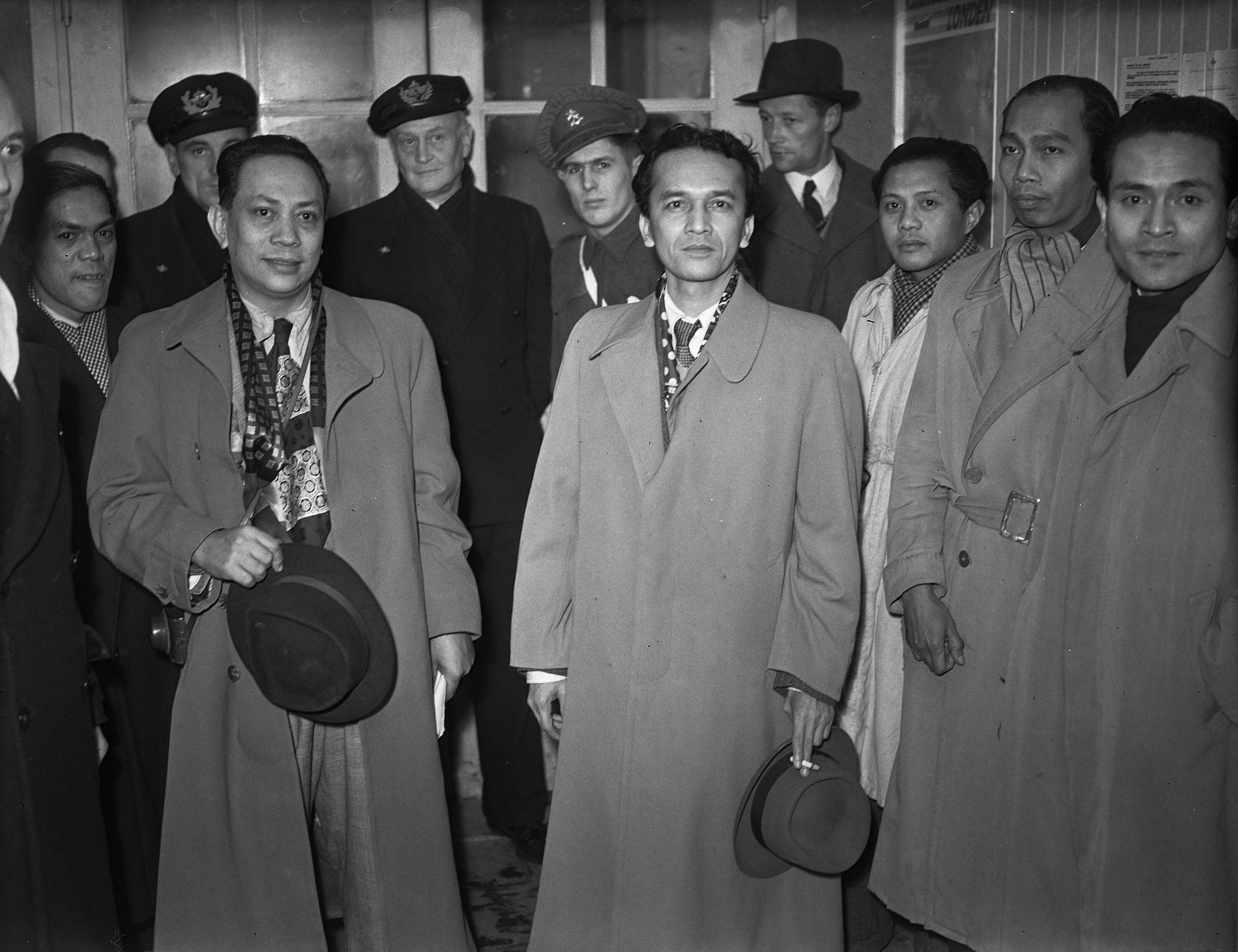
Dr. A.K. Gani, Deputy Prime Minister of the Republic of Indonesia, during his stop at Schiphol, took a photo with fellow delegation members

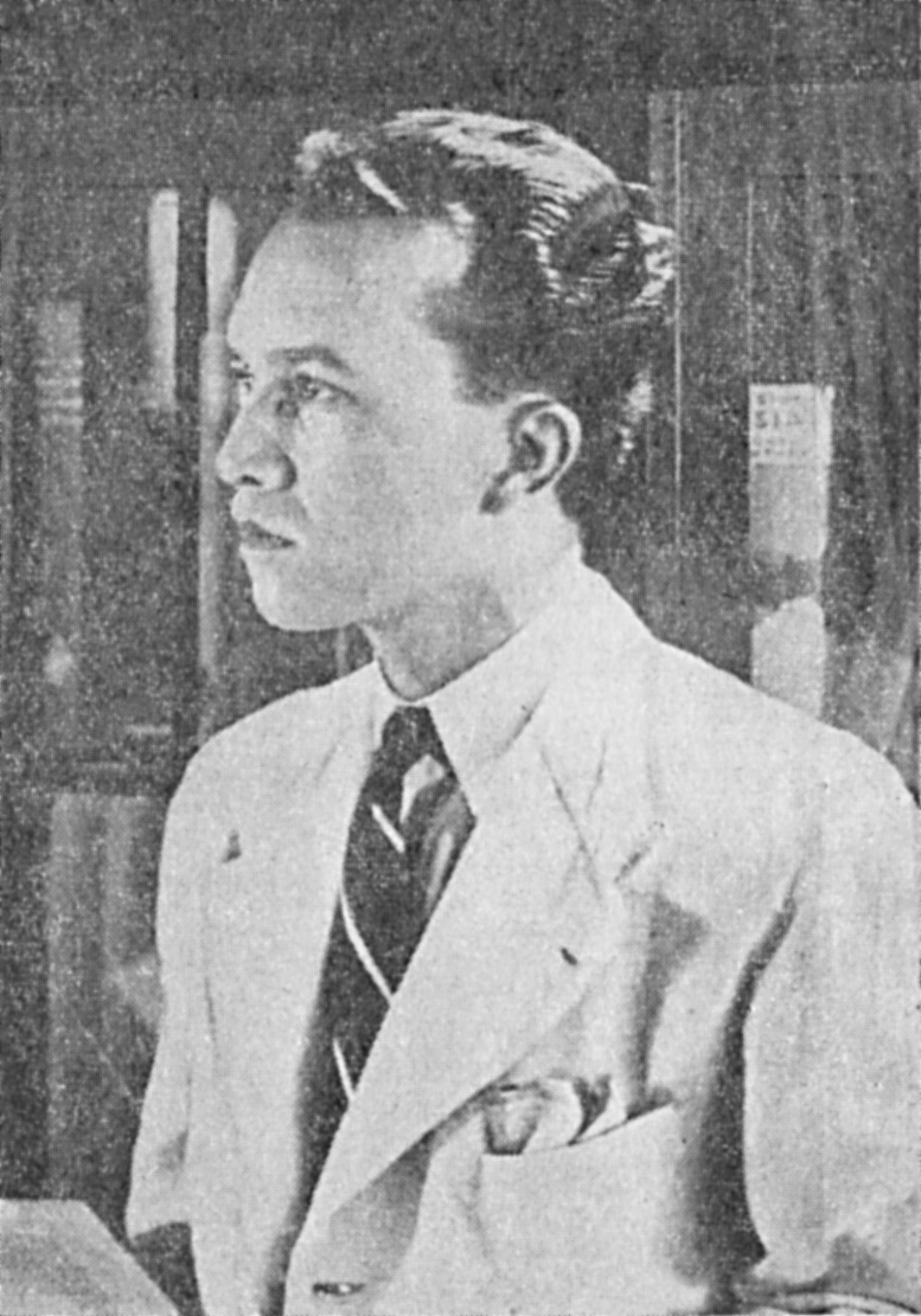
Dr. A.K. Gani when starring in the film Asmara Moerni

== Filmography ==
Year	Title	Role	Notes	Ref.
1941	Asmara Moerni	dr. Pardi		
