= First Amir Sjarifuddin Cabinet =

First Amir Sjarifuddin Cabinet Kabinet Amir Sjarifuddin I
- 5th Cabinet of Indonesia
- 1947
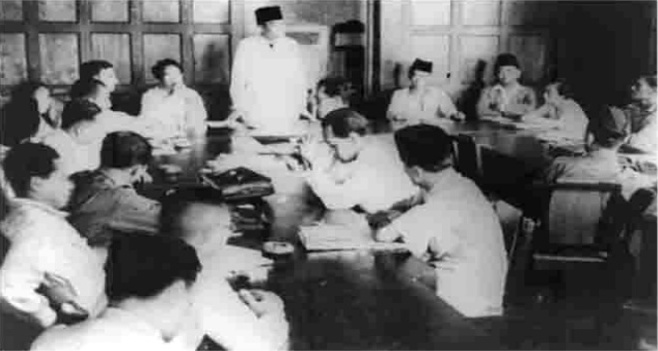
- President Sukarno inaugurated the Syarifuddin Cabinet
- Date formed: 3 July 1947
- Date dissolved: 11 November 1947

People and organisations
- Head of state: Sukarno
- Head of government: Amir Sjarifuddin
- No. of ministers: 31 ministers
- Member party: PS; Parkindo; PBI; BTI; PNI; PKI; People's Youth; PSII; Catholic; Independent
- Status in legislature: KNIP; Majority left-wing coalition: 197 / 514

History
- Predecessor: Sjahrir III Cabinet
- Successor: Amir Sjarifuddin II Cabinet

The First Amir Sjarifuddin Cabinet (Indonesian: Kabinet Amir Sjarifuddin I) was the fifth Indonesian cabinet and was in office from 3 July to 11 November 1947.

== Background ==
Following the resignation of the Third Sjahrir Cabinet on 27 June 1947, President Sukarno called a meeting with the leaders of the Masyumi Party, the Indonesian National Party (PNI), the Socialist Party and the Labour Party to ask them to form a cabinet. However, the party leaders were unable to agree to Masyumi's demands for senior ministerial posts that would have enabled it to dominate the cabinet. Finally, on 3 July, agreement was reached between the PNI, the Socialist Party, the Labour Party and the Masjumi breakaway party, the Indonesian Islamic Union Party (PSII), to support Amir Sjarifuddin as prime minister.

== Composition ==
Nine of the ministers had served in the previous cabinet. The government was intended to be inclusive, with representation from all existing parties and groupings. In the absence of Masjumi, the PSII represented the Muslim bloc.

=== Cabinet leadership ===
- Prime Minister: Amir Sjarifuddin (Socialist Party)
- Deputy Prime Minister: Dr. A. K. Gani (Indonesian National Party – PNI)
- Deputy Prime Minister: Setyadjit Soegondo (PBI)

=== Departmental Ministers ===
- Minister of Home Affairs: W. Wondoamiseno (Indonesian Islamic Union Party - PSII)
- Minister of Foreign Affairs: Agus Salim
- Minister of Welfare: Adnan Kapau Gani (PSII)
- Minister of Defense: Amir Sjarifuddin (Socialist Party)
- Minister of Education: Ali Sastroamidjojo (Indonesian National Party - PNI)
- Minister of Finance: A. A. Maramis (PNI)
- Minister of Information: Ir. Setiadi Reksoprodjo
- Minister of Transportation: Djuanda Kartawidjaja
- Minister of Public Works: Mohammad Enoch
- Minister of Health: Dr. Johannes Leimena (Parkindo)
- Minister of Social Affairs: Soeprodjo (PBI)
- Minister of Justice: Soesanto Tirtoprodjo (PNI)
- Minister of Religious Affairs: Achmad Asj'ari (PSII)
- Minister of Labor: S. K. Trimurti (PBI)

=== State Ministers (without portfolio) ===
- State Minister: Sri Sultan Hamengkubuwana IX
- State Minister: Wikana (Youth Congress Board)
- State Minister: Suja'as (Indonesian Peasants Front)
- State Minister: Siauw Giok Tjhan
- State Minister: Hindromartono (Socialist Party)
- State Minister: Maroeto Darusman (Communist Party of Indonesia - PKI)

=== Junior Ministers ===
- Junior Minister of Home Affairs: Abdul Madjid Djojoadiningrat (Socialist Party)
- Junior Minister of Foreign Affairs: Tamzil (Socialist Party)
- First Junior Minister of Welfare : Ignatius J. Kasimo (PKRI)
- Second Junior Minister of Welfare: Adjidarmo Tjokronegoro (Socialist Party)
- Junior Minister of Defense: Arudji Kartawinata (PSII)
- Junior Minister of Finance: Dr. Ong Eng Die (Socialist Party)
- Junior Minister of Information: Sjahboedin Latif (PSII)
- Junior Minister of Public Works: Herling Laoh (PNI)
- Junior Minister of Health: Dr. Satrio (PBI)
- Junior Minister of Social Affairs: Sukoso Wirjosapitro (PSII)
- Junior Minister of Labor: Wilopo (PNI)

On 11 August 1947, Mohammad Enoch resigned and was replaced by his deputy, Herling Laoh.

== Cabinet reshuffle ==
On 11 November 1947, Amir reshuffled the cabinet to allow the inclusion of the Masjumi Party. This meant that the cabinet lasted only four months and eight days.
