= Todung Sutan Gunung Mulia =

Indonesian politician (1896–1966)

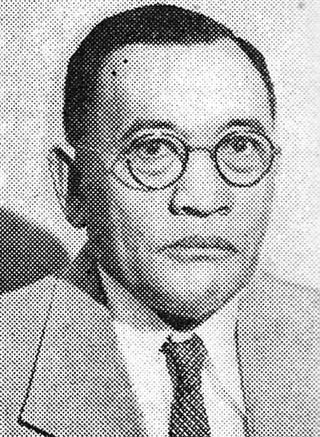
- Todung, c. 1954

2nd Minister of Teaching
- In office 14 November 1945 – 12 March 1946 (Note: Mulia was appointed Junior Minister of Teaching in Sjahrir's second cabinet (March–October 1946), but did not take the office.)
- Prime Minister: Sutan Sjahrir
- Preceded by: Ki Hadjar Dewantara
- Succeeded by: Soewandi

Member of the Volksraad
- In office 1935–1942
- In office 21 May 1921 – 1929

Personal details
- Born: Todung Harahap; 21 January 1896 Padang Sidempuan, Tapanuli, Dutch East Indies
- Died: 11 November 1966 (aged 70) Amsterdam, Netherlands

Todung Harahap gelar Sutan Gunung Mulia (21 January 1896 – 11 November 1966), commonly known as T. S. G. Mulia, was an Indonesian educator, politician, and church organizer. He served as Minister of Education between November 1945 and March 1946, co-founded the Indonesian Christian Party, and was the first chair of the Communion of Churches in Indonesia (PGI).

Originating from a Batak noble family, Mulia studied to become a teacher and later for a doctorate in the Netherlands during 1911–1919 and 1929–1933. He became a religious and political activist upon his return to the Indies, being one of the first Christian Indonesian public intellectuals. In addition to his work as a teacher and lecturer, he served for over ten years in the colonial legislature as a representative of the Batak people and was active in nationalist youth organizations. He was also active in Christian missionary activities and the organization of churches during the 1930s.

Mulia pushed Indonesian nationalist viewpoints during the colonial period both through political and church channels. Following Indonesian independence, he co-founded the Indonesian Christian Party in November 1945 and served under Sutan Sjahrir briefly as education minister. He then focused on church organizing, being elected the first chairman of PGI in 1950 upon its formation. His tenure as PGI's chairman saw the formation of various Christian organizations including the Indonesian Bible Society and the Christian University of Indonesia.

== Early life and family ==
Todung Harahap was born on 21 January 1896 in the town of Padang Sidempuan, in present-day North Sumatra and in the colonial Tapanuli Residency. He was the sole child of Humala Mangaraja Hamonangan, a Christian Angkola Batak noble and plantation owner. Harahap's grandfather descended from the kings of Padang Lawas and had converted to Christianity in 1861. (Note: Angkola Bataks followed a traditional Batak religion before their conversion to Christianity, which in turn was motivated by their displacement during the Padri War in the early nineteenth century.) Mulia's younger cousin, Amir Syarifuddin, would later serve as Prime Minister of Indonesia. In 1911, Mulia graduated from an Europeesche Lagere School in Tapanuli, and he was sent to Leiden in the Netherlands to study as a teacher.

During his time in the Netherlands, he made acquaintances of various supporters of the Dutch Ethical Policy such as Conrad Theodor van Deventer and Christiaan Snouck Hurgronje, along with Christian missionary Hendrik Kraemer. At Leiden, Mulia also became a member of the Indische Vereeniging, and supported the association's entry into politics. An internal dispute in 1919 led the organization to split along the lines of Javanese and non-Javanese students, with Mulia joining the short-lived non-Javanese association Soematra Sepakat. Mulia graduated from Leiden University's law faculty in 1919 and returned to the Indies.

== Career ==
=== Colonial period ===
After returning to Indonesia, Mulia became headmaster at a school in the town of Kotanopan, in Mandailing Natal. In 1921, Mulia joined the Volksraad, being sworn in on 21 May 1921. During his time in the Volksraad, he opposed handing over control of colonial schools for indigenous peoples to missionary organizations, as he was concerned that the organizations may restrict enrollment to Christians. He initially joined the youth organization Jong Sumatranen Bond, but as the organization went into decline he instead joined the Jong Batak Bond and took part in its first meeting in 1925. He moved to the colonial capital of Batavia to become director of a teacher's school in 1927, and joined a Christian political party, the Christian Constitutional Party (CSP) in 1929, but as the party took on a more pro-Dutch stance, he gradually moved away from the party. He eventually resigned from the party and the Volksraad in 1929. Mulia was among the first Christian Indonesian intellectuals in the public sphere.

Mulia left Indonesia for the Netherlands in 1929 to pursue a doctorate, studying pedagogy in Amsterdam and law in Leiden University. His dissertation for a doctorate in literature was submitted in December 1933. In the dissertation, Primitive Thinking within Modern Science, Mulia argued against a common view held by many Christian missionaries at the time that "primitive" (i.e. non-Western) thinking lacked causality and logic. Later scholars noted Mulia's consistent use of "Indonesia" in place of "Netherlands Indies" in his dissertation. During his second period in the Netherlands, Mulia co-founded the Indonesische Christen Jongeren, an association for Indonesian Christian students.

As part of his missionary work, Mulia edited the magazine Zaman Baroe, which was in print from 1926 to 1931 and discussed national politics from a Christian point of view. He also attended the International Missionary Conference in Jerusalem in 1928. The conference put serious efforts into addressing a variety of sociopolitical and economic issues in missionary areas, and was attended by a large number of newer church organizations. Upon his return from Jerusalem, Mulia began criticizing missions in the Dutch East Indies which neglected such issues. He also translated the Bible into various local languages and distributed them to various regions of the Indies. In 1932, he organized a conference of Batak Christians in Padalarang, forming a branch for the Batak Christian Protestant Church in Bandung. He attended another International Missionary Conference held in 1938 in Tambaram, with a larger native Indonesian delegation.

Following his second return to the Indies, Mulia worked at the colonial government's Economic Affairs office. He also returned to lecturing at teacher's schools, and he was appointed again to the Volksraad in 1935. In 1936, he was appointed a member of the colonial electoral commission, and in 1940 he became deputy speaker of the Volksraad. By the time of the Japanese invasion of the Dutch East Indies, he was working at the Education Department.

=== Independent Indonesia ===
Some time after the proclamation of Indonesian independence, Central Indonesian National Committee chairman Sutan Sjahrir called for the formation of political parties. Mulia attended a meeting of Indonesian Protestant Christian leaders in 10-11 November 1945 which resulted in the founding of the Indonesian Christian Party (Parkindo). (Note: Initially named the National Christian Party, renamed to Parkindo at the party's first congress in December.) He was also appointed as Minister of Education (then titled "Minister of Teaching") in Sjahrir's first cabinet on 14 November 1945. During his brief tenure, Mulia updated school curriculums to include nationalist material, worked to repair schools and other education infrastructure damaged during wartime, and expanded government coverage of educational institutions to also cover religious schools. Sjahrir would reassign Mulia as Junior Minister of Teaching in his second cabinet formed on 12 March 1946, but Mulia refused the office.

In May 1950, with the Indonesian National Revolution ending, various Protestant Churches in Indonesia arranged a conference and declared the founding of the Council of Churches in Indonesia (DGI). Mulia was elected as DGI's first chairman in that conference. After DGI's formation, its committee began exploring ideas to start a Christian higher education institution, and by July 1953 Mulia had started a foundation to this end. The Christian University of Indonesia would be founded on 15 October 1953, with Mulia, Yap Thiam Hien, and Benjamin Thomas Phillip Sigar as co-founders. Mulia also chaired the Indonesian Bible Society (which he started in 1954), and when in 1963 President Sukarno banned the importation of Indonesian-language books (which included the Bible), Mulia organized the setting up of a printing house to produce Indonesian-language bibles. It would be opened in February 1966. Mulia would be succeeded as DGI's chairman by Johannes Ludwig Chrisostomus Abineno.

Mulia was also appointed as professor of sociology at the University of Indonesia. He also edited one of the first Indonesian-language encyclopedias.

== Death and honors ==
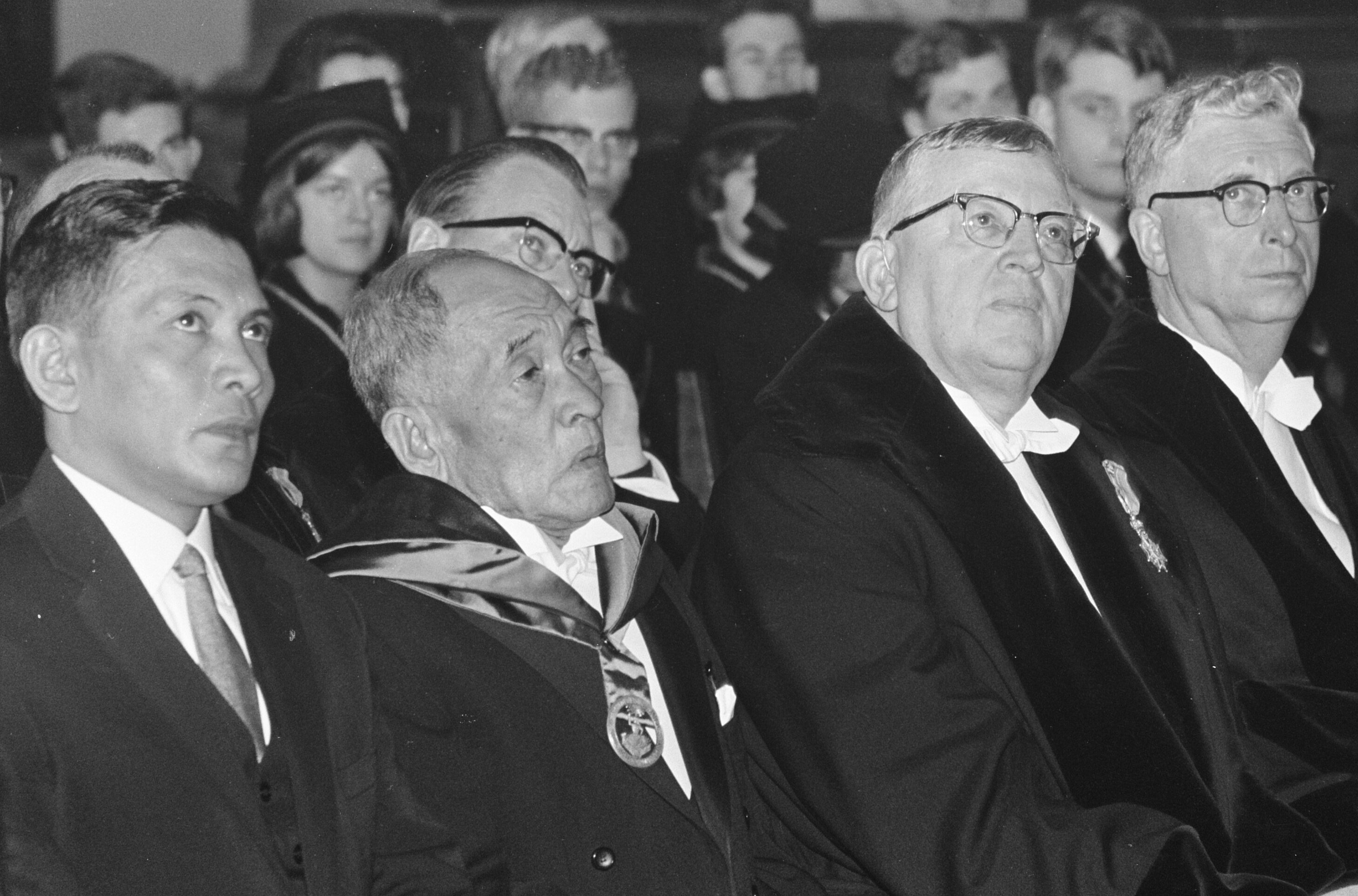
Mulia (2nd from left) in Amsterdam, 1966

In October 1966, Mulia went to Amsterdam to receive a honoris causa doctorate in theology from Vrije Universiteit Amsterdam. He died there on 11 November 1966, and his body was returned to Jakarta to be buried. His grave is located at the Petamburan Public Cemetery in Central Jakarta. The Badan Penerbit Kristen publishing house, which Mulia had founded in 1946, would be renamed to BPK Gunung Mulia in Mulia's honor in 1971.
