= Amir Sjarifuddin =

Indonesian politician and journalist (1907–1948)

Amir Sjarifuddin Harahap
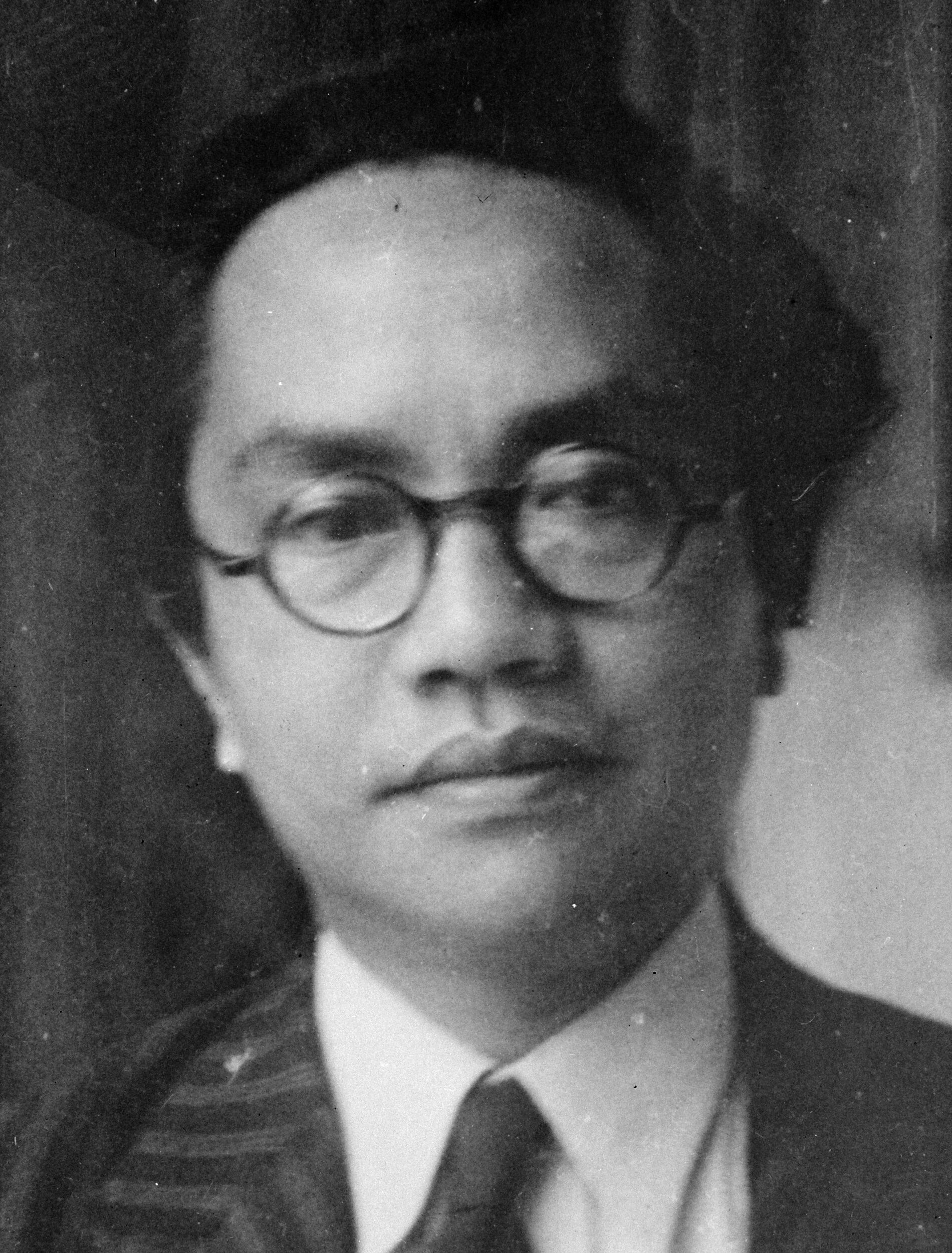
- Portrait, c. 1947

2nd Prime Minister of Indonesia
- In office 3 July 1947 – 29 January 1948
- President: Sukarno
- Deputy: Adnan Kapau Gani; Setyadjit Soegondo; Samsoeddin; Wondoamiseno
- Preceded by: Sutan Sjahrir
- Succeeded by: Mohammad Hatta

2nd Minister of Defense
- In office 14 November 1945 – 29 January 1948
- President: Sukarno
- Prime Minister: Sutan Sjahrir; Himself
- Preceded by: Supriyadi (never took office); Sulyoadikusumo (acting)
- Succeeded by: Mohammad Hatta (acting); Hamengkubuwono IX

1st Minister of Information
- In office 2 September 1945 – 12 March 1946
- President: Sukarno
- Prime Minister: Sutan Sjahrir
- Preceded by: Office established
- Succeeded by: Mohammad Natsir

Personal details
- Born: Amir Sjarifoeddin Harahap; 27 April 1907 Medan, Sumatra's East Coast, Dutch East Indies
- Died: 19 December 1948 (aged 41) Karanganyar, Indonesia
- Cause of death: Execution by shooting
- Resting place: Ngaliyan Public Cemetery
- Party: PKI (1935–1948); Gerindo (1937–1942); Parsi (1945); PS (1945–1948)
- Spouse: Djaenah Harahap (m. 1935)
- Education: Rechts Hogeschool (Mr.)
- Occupation: Politician; journalist

Military service
- Battles/wars: Indonesian National Revolution; 1948 PKI Rebellion

Amir Sjarifuddin Harahap (EVO: Amir Sjarifoeddin Harahap; 27 April 1907 – 19 December 1948) was an Indonesian politician and journalist who served as the second prime minister of Indonesia from 1947 until 1948. A major leader of the left wing during the Indonesian National Revolution, he previously served as Minister of Information from 1945 until 1946 and Minister of Defense from 1945 until 1948. Amir was born into the Sumatran aristocracy and was educated at Leiden University. At Leiden, he became a member of the board of the Gymnasium student association in Haarlem and was involved in the Batak student organization Jong Batak. He returned to Indonesia due to family troubles but continued his education at the Rechts Hogeschool in Batavia.

After graduating, he became active in literary and journalist circles, joining the editorial board of the newspaper Panorama. He also became involved with left-wing politics and led a group of younger Marxists in the establishment of the Indonesian People's Movement (Gerindo). In 1933, due to his political activities, Amir was imprisoned, and almost exiled to the Boven-Digoel concentration camp, had it not for the efforts of his cousin and teacher. During the Japanese occupation of the Dutch East Indies, Amir was one of a few prominent Indonesian politicians who actively fought against the Japanese, together with fellow future prime minister Sutan Sjahrir. Following the Proclamation of Indonesian Independence, he was appointed Minister of Information in President Sukarno's Presidential Cabinet. Later, he was appointed the Minister of Defense following the absence of Supriyadi.

After the fall of Sjahrir's cabinet, Amir was chosen to head the new cabinet, with the backing of a broad coalition. He faced a backlash over the cabinet's decision to ratify the Renville Agreement, and he resigned from the prime ministership, being succeeded by Vice President Mohammad Hatta as prime minister. After his ousting, he became involved in the People's Democratic Front (FDR). Following the beginning of the Madiun Affair, Amir and other FDR leaders rushed to assume control of the newly formed "National Front" government. In the following weeks, pro-government forces, led by the Siliwangi Division, began pushing the leftist forces back. During the fighting, Amir was captured, and imprisoned in Yogyakarta. After the withdrawal of Republican forces after Operation Kraai, he was executed, along with fifty other leftist prisoners.

== Early life ==
Amir Sjarifuddin Harahap was born in Medan, Dutch East Indies (now Indonesia), on 27 April 1907. He was born into the Sumatran aristocracy. His grandfather, Mangaraja Monang, was a Batak nobleman – who had been baptized into Christianity and named Ephraim – with the title of Sutan Gunung Tua. Amir's father, Djamin, was also a nobleman, with the title of Sutan Soripada Harahap, however he later left the religion and became a Muslim, after marrying Amir's mother, Basunu Siregar, a devout Muslim woman who came from a well-respected family from the Malay-Islamic community. Amir was the eldest child of seven children and was given the title of Sutan Gunung Sualoon. He came from a family of prosecutors, with both his grandfather and father practicing the profession. Amir began his education in 1914 when he attended the Europeesche Lagere School (ELS) in Medan. However, in 1916, he was forced to attend a different ELS in Sibolga, as his father was transferred there. In August 1921, he and his older cousin, Todung Sutan Gunung Mulia, left for the Netherlands. There, he resided with the Smink family in Haarlem, 29 kilometers north of Leiden. He continued his education at the Gymnasium in Haarlem, though Mulia returned to Indonesia, as he had completed his schooling already. After only a year at the Haarlem Gymnasium, he moved to the State Gymnasium of Leiden.

In Leiden, Amir stayed at the house of Mrs. Antonie Aris van de Losdrecht–Sizzo, the widow of the evangelist and missionary Antonie Aris van de Loosdrecht, who was killed in Tana Toraja in 1913. He became involved in the Batak student organization Jong Batak and was becoming increasingly interested in Christianity and the Bible. As a student, he would become a member of the Perhimpoenan Indonesia ("Indonesian Association"), under the leadership of future-Indonesian vice president Mohammad Hatta. During his time in Leiden, he began to admire and be influenced by the Count of Mirabeau—Honoré Gabriel Riqueti— as well as Maximillien Robespierre, both of whom would influence Amir in his later career. He returned to Indonesia following family troubles, as his father had lost his job as Chief Prosecutor because he punched a prisoner. He would continue his education at the Rechts Hogeschool, and later converted from Islam to Christianity in 1931, being baptized in the Huria Church, in Batavia. He would go on to give sermons at the church.

== Journalism and World War II ==
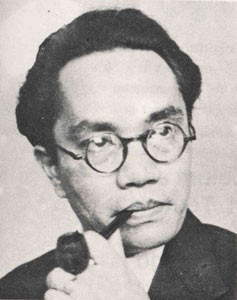
Amir Sjarifuddin with a smoking pipe, date unknown

Throughout the 1930s, Amir was active in literary and journalistic circles, joining the editorial board of the newspaper Panorama, together with Liem Koen Hian, Sanusi Pane, and Mohammad Yamin. In 1933, Amir was imprisoned by the Dutch for his Aksi Massa ("Mass Action") essay, an essay published in the Banteng Partindo magazine that encouraged the public to drive out the colonial invaders. Though in actuality, the essay was written by Mohammad Yamin, with Amir only stated as the author in the published version. Amir was imprisoned for two years, being released on 5 June 1935. In mid-1936, together with his colleagues Liem, Pane, and Yamin, Amir started another newspaper, Kebangoenan, which – as with Panorama – was published by Phoa Liong Gie's Siang Po Printing Press. In 1937, towards the end of the Dutch rule, Amir led a group of younger Marxists in the establishment of the Indonesian People's Movement (Gerindo). Under Amir's leadership, the party was considered a radical leftist anti-fascist political party, influenced by the ideology of Communism. The Soviet Union's Dimitrov doctrine had called for a common front against fascism which helped swell the number of Indonesians taking a cooperative approach with regards to the Dutch colonial administration in an attempt to secure Indonesian independence.

Gerindo was one of the more significant cooperative parties in the years leading to World War II whose objectives included a fully Indonesian legislature; It had modest goals in comparison to the Dutch-suppressed radical nationalists led by the likes of Sukarno and Mohammad Hatta, whom Sjarifuddin had met before the War. By 1940, Dutch intelligence suspected him of being involved with the Communist underground. Having watched the increased strength and influence of Imperial Japan, he was one of several Indonesian leaders who warned against the danger of fascism before the war. Before the German invasion of the Netherlands, Amir himself led and promoted boycotts against trade with Japan. When the colony was invaded by Japan, his prominent role in these campaigns prompted the head of Dutch intelligence to provide Amir with 25,000 guilders to organize an underground resistance movement. Upon Japan's occupation of the East Indies, the Japanese enforced total suppression of any opposition to their rule. Most Indonesian leaders obliged either by becoming 'neutral observers' or by actively cooperating. Amir was one of a few prominent Indonesian politicians who actively fought against the Japanese, together with fellow future prime minister Sutan Sjahrir. The Japanese arrested Sjarifuddin in 1943, and he escaped execution only due to intervention from Sukarno, whose popularity in Indonesia – and hence the importance to the war effort – was recognized by the Japanese.

By 1945, Amir had become known and respected as a politician. Although he had been in contact with the 'illegal' Communist Party of Indonesia (PKI), he had nothing but disdain for the 'unsophisticated' and unknown Marxists who re-established the party in 1935. His closest colleagues were from the 'illegal PKI' underground and the pre-war Indonesian People's Movement (Gerindo). Together, they formed the Socialist Party of Indonesia (Parsi) on 1 November 1945. At a two-party conference on 16 – 17 December, it was announced that Amir's Parsi would merge with Sjahrir's political grouping, the Socialist People's Party (Paras), forming the Socialist Party (PS). With Sjahrir serving as chairman, and Amir serving as vice chairman. The Socialist Party quickly became the strongest pro-government party, especially in Yogyakarta and East Java. The party accepted the argument of Amir and its other leaders that the time was not ripe to implement socialism, rather that international support necessary for independence be sought, and that unruly constituents had to be opposed. The party's westernized leaders showed more faith in Netherlands left-wing forces than in the revolutionary fervor of the Indonesian people, which became a source of discontent among the party's opponents.

== National Revolution ==
=== Cabinet minister ===
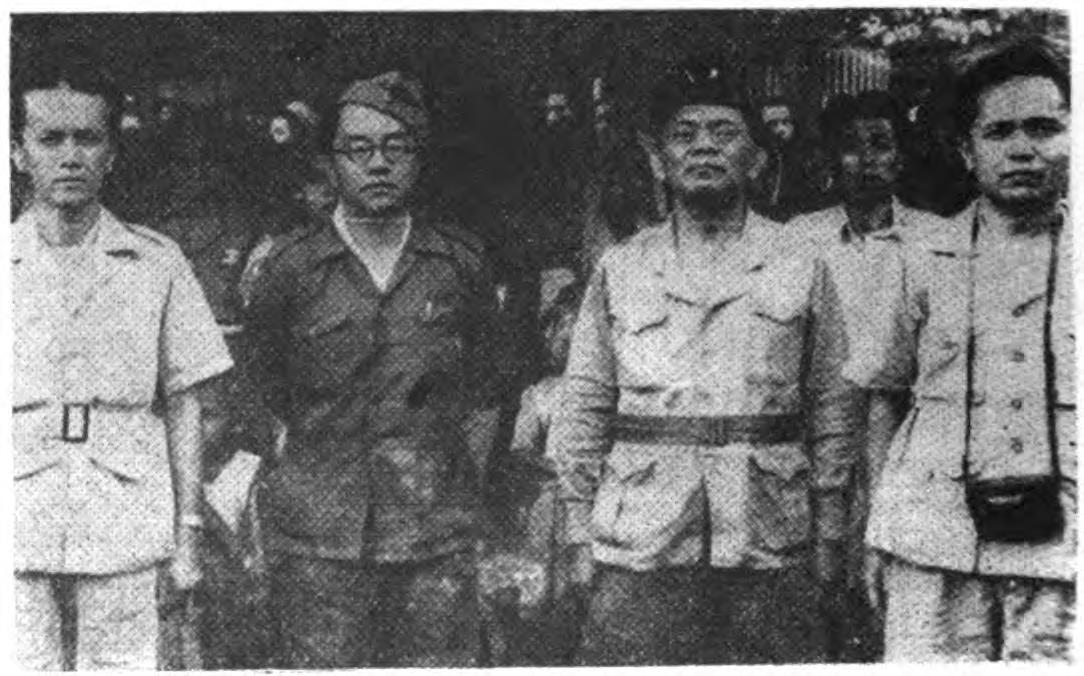
From left to right: Adnan Kapau Gani, Amir, Oerip Soemohardjo, and Mohamad Isa in a mass meeting in the Grand Mosque of Palembang, c. 1946

Following the Japanese surrender on 15 August 1945 and the proclamation of Indonesian independence two days later, the Republic announced its first ministry on 4 September. The seventeen-member cabinet was composed mostly of 'collaborating' nationalists; (Note: Most Indonesian nationalist leaders saw the Japanese occupation of Indonesia as an opportunity to take advantage of in their pursuit of independence. Their consequent cooperation with the Japanese saw the returning Dutch brand them 'collaborators', and thus illegitimate leaders, in an attempt to undermine support for the newly-proclaimed republic.) Amir was appointed Information Minister under the new cabinet, though at the time his fate was unknown, as he was then imprisoned by the Japanese. He was eventually released on 1 October 1945 and took office shortly after. Amir's appointment as minister of information was likely due to his background in journalism before World War II. Early in the Revolution, Amir worked closely with the country's first prime minister Sutan Sjahrir; the two played a major role in effectively shaping the arrangements linking the new government of Indonesia with its people. On 30 October Amir, along with Sukarno and Hatta, were flown into the East Javan city of Surabaya by the desperate British caretaker administration. The three were seen as the only Indonesian leaders likely able to quell fighting between Republican and British Indian forces in which the British Brigade was hopelessly outnumbered and facing annihilation. A ceasefire was immediately adhered to, but fighting resumed after confused communications and mistrust between the two sides, leading to the Battle of Surabaya.

On 16 October 1945, Sjahrir and Amir took control of the Central Indonesian National Committee, and following the 11 November transition to parliamentary government, Amir was appointed to a new cabinet with Sjahrir as Prime Minister. President Sukarno accepted a proposal for the cabinet to answer to the Central Indonesian National Committee (KNIP) acting as Parliament rather than to the President. This watershed event ushered in the so-called 'liberal' or parliamentary form of government, which prevailed against the Sukarnoist-proposed constitution for twelve years. Leadership was thus handed to a 'modernizing' Western-minded intellectual, who at the time were thought to be the coming leaders of Asia and more palatable to Western ideas of government. When considered against previous forms of government — indigenous Indonesian, Dutch, Japanese, and even the first brief Republican government — this was the most revolutionary political change at a national level during the National Revolution. Amir left the position of Information Minister on 4 January 1946 and was replaced by Mohammad Natsir. Instead, he became the Minister of Defense. His main task as minister was to make the army an "effective and responsible tool of government policy". His position as minister, however, was a source of friction with the People's Security Army (TKR) and its new commander, Sudirman, who had nominated their candidate, Sultan Hamengkubuwono IX of Yogyakarta. However, the Sultan was not eager to contest the position.

Amir was a central figure in the government's 'anti-fascist' program with the army a key target, which caused further frictions. Sjahrir attacked PETA-trained army officers as 'traitors', 'fascists', and 'running dogs' who had cooperated with the Japanese. Amir promoted the Red Army as a model of a citizens' army loyal to the government and holding socialist ideals. On 19 February 1946, Amir inaugurated a socialist and Masyumi politician-dominated 'education staff' for the army. The body appointed fifty-five 'political officers' at the end of May without consulting the army command. These new officers were to educate each TRI unit on the goals of the revolution. He was not, however, able to effectively impose such ideals on unit commanders, particularly as Sudirman and other PETA-trained resented the 'fascist' slur cast on them. The Marxist overtones of Amir's new military academies conflicted with the popular army view of being above politics and the need to play a unifying role in the national struggle; the army leadership consequently rejected attempts to introduce partisan ideology and alignments. This antagonism between the government and PETA-trained officers forced Amir to find an armed support base elsewhere. He aligned himself with sympathetic Dutch-educated officers in certain divisions, such as the West Java 'Siliwangi' Division the command of which had been assumed by KNIL Lieutenant A.H. Nasution in May 1946. Another source of support for the new cabinet was the more educated armed pemuda sympathetic to the cabinet's 'anti-fascist' approach. With an engaging personality and persuasive oratory skills, Amir had more time and aptitude than Sjahrir for party building, and he played the main part in wooing this pemuda.

=== Prime minister ===
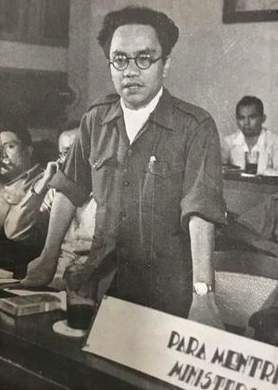
Amir Sjarifuddin giving a speech, c. 1947

A split between Amir's and Prime Minister Sjahrir's supporters rapidly deepened in 1947. There had long been mutual suspicion between Sjahrir and the communists who had returned from the Netherlands in 1946; the fading of the 'anti-fascist' cause made these suspicions more obvious. Sjahrir's preoccupation with diplomacy, his physical isolation in Jakarta from revolution-infused Central Java, and his dislike of mass rallies allowed the more Moscow-inclined Marxists to assume more control in both the Socialist Party and the Left-wing as a whole. By June 1946, Sjahrir's increasing isolation from the coalition encouraged the opposing factions to depose him. This group put their support behind Amir, the alternative Socialist leader. On 26 June 1947, Amir, along with two other Moscow-inclined Ministers Abdulmadjid Djojoadiningrat, and Wikana, backed by a majority of the left, withdrew their support for Sjahrir. They argued that Sjahrir had compromised the Republic in his pursuit of diplomacy – the same charge that deposed every revolutionary government – and that in the face of Dutch belligerence, such conciliation seemed futile.

Following the resignation of Sjahrir as prime minister, a new government needed to be formed. On 30 June 1947, President Sukarno appointed Amir, Adnan Kapau Gani, Soekiman Wirjosandjojo, and Setyadjit Soegondo to form a new cabinet. During these negotiations, Amir courted a broad coalition but hostility from Muslim Masyumi prevented its leader, Soekiman, as well as many pro-Sjahrir 'religious socialists' from previous cabinets from joining the new cabinet. Other influential Masyumi factions, such as that of Wondoamiseno, provided support. Although Amir's communist allies controlled about 10% of the 34th with Amir's Defence Ministry their sole key one, this cabinet was the highest point of orthodox communist influence in the Revolution.

On 3 July 1947, Amir was inaugurated as prime minister, alongside his cabinet, which would be known as the First Amir Sjarifuddin Cabinet. He would also continue to serve as minister concurrently. There were rumors about Amir's appointment as prime minister, based on the consideration that he would be needed in negotiations with the Dutch. In running the government, he appointed Adnan Kapau Gani as his de facto confidant in dealing with foreign affairs. Following a backlash over the Renville Agreement, for which Amir received much of the blame, PNI and Masyumi cabinet members resigned in early January 1948. On 23 January, with his support base disappearing, Amir resigned from the prime ministership.

== Madiun affair and death ==
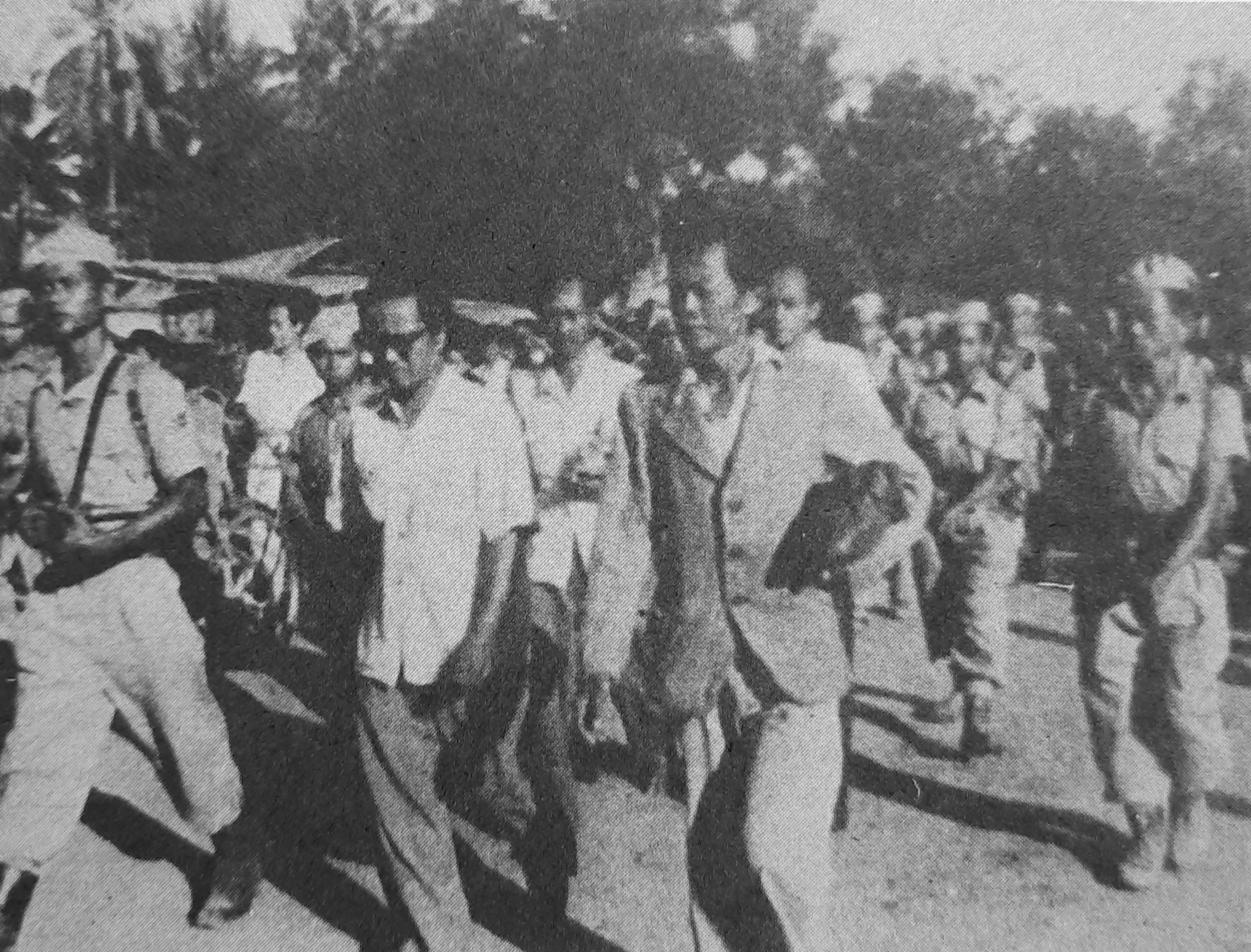
Amir Sjarifuddin (wearing glasses), after being detained by the Indonesian military, c. 1948

Following the fall of his second cabinet, on 26 January 1948, a new cabinet was formed, which was headed by Vice President Mohammad Hatta. Opposition to the Hatta Cabinet coalesced into a new organization, known as the People's Democratic Front, which began holding demonstrations, demanding the return of Amir to the Cabinet and as Minister of Defense. Amir joined the fold, and heavily criticized Hatta and his cabinet, labelling it as the "Masyumi Cabinet", as it was dominated by members of the Islamic Masyumi Party. Meanwhile, other leftist parties and organizations supporting the government joined an opposing organization, known as the People's Revolutionary Movement (GGR).

However, Amir's efforts to overthrow the Hatta Cabinet were in vain, as the Hatta Cabinet continued along with its four main programs. Over the following months, the political situation remained tense, while the economic situation increasingly deteriorated, and relations with the Dutch, after the Renville Agreement did not appear to be getting better. In August 1948, Musso, the 1920s leader of the PKI, arrived in Yogyakarta from his exile in the Soviet Union. Amir and the leadership of the People's Democratic Front immediately accepted his authority, and Amir admitted membership of the underground PKI in 1935. Adhering to Musso's Stalinist thinking of a single party of the working class, the major leftist parties in the Front dissolved themselves into the PKI.

Meanwhile, worker strikes were held in Delanggu, Surakarta. The strikes escalated into demonstrations, between communist and pro-government forces, before increasing rapidly into full-on open warfare. On 18 September 1948, a group of PKI supporters took over strategic points in the Madiun area in what would come to be known as the Madiun Affair. They killed pro-government officers and announced over the radio the formation of a new "National Front" government. Caught by surprise by the premature coup attempt, Communist leaders, including Amir, rushed to Madiun to take charge of the government. The following day, about 200 pro-PKI and other leftist leaders who remained in Yogyakarta were arrested by the Republican government, with Sukarno denouncing the Madiun rebels over the radio, and calling upon Indonesians to rally against Musso and his plans for a Soviet-style government. Musso replied on radio that he would fight to the finish, while, the People's Democratic Front branches in Banten and Sumatra announced they had nothing to do with the rebellion.

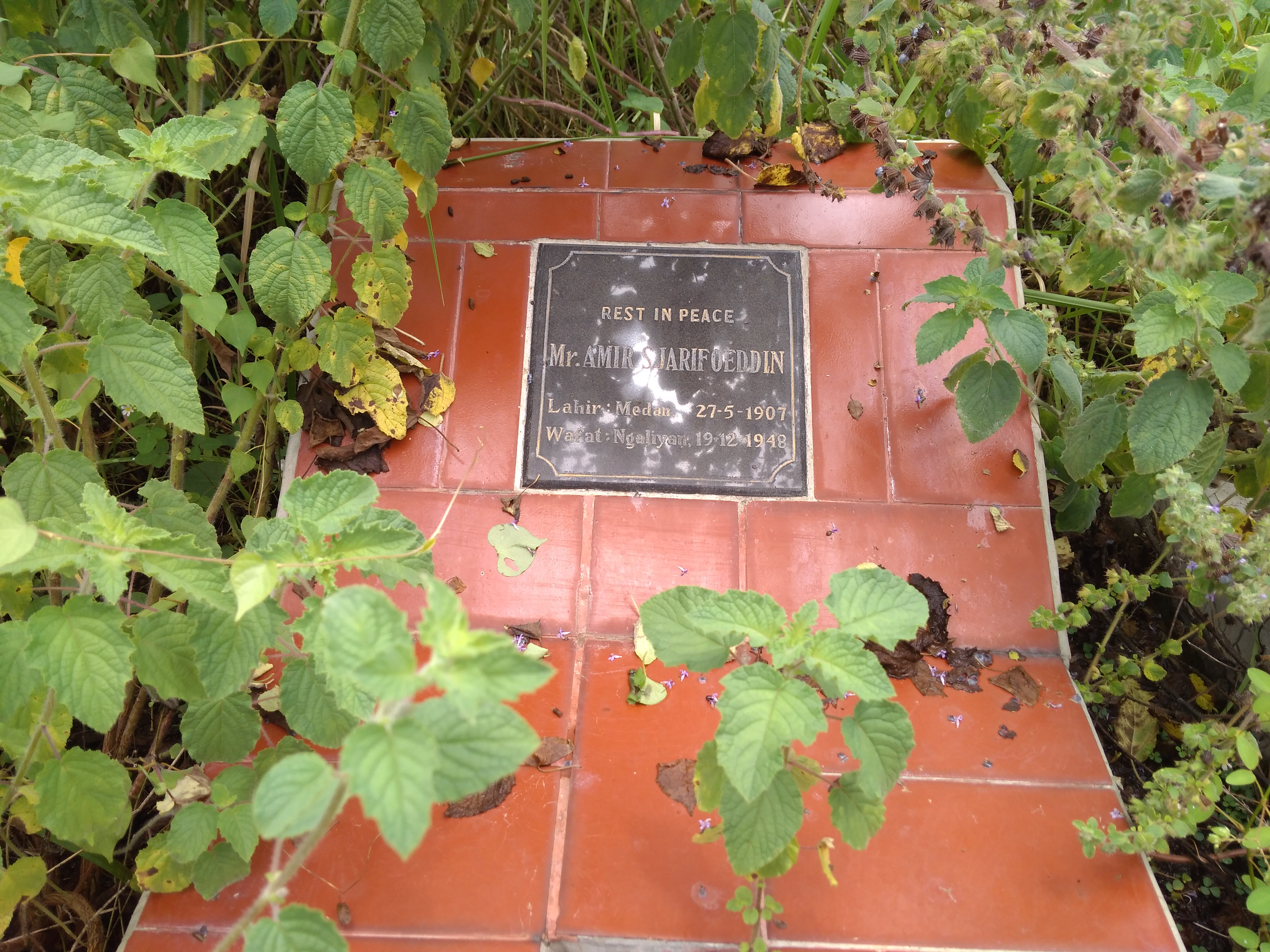
Amir's grave at Ngaliyan Public Cemetery in Karanganyar Regency

In the following weeks, pro-government forces, led by the Siliwangi Division, marched on Madiun where there were an estimated 5,000-10,000 pro-PKI soldiers. As the rebels retreated they killed Masyumi and PNI leaders and officials, and in the villages, killings took place along santri-abangan lines. On 30 September, the rebels abandoned Madiun and were pursued by pro-government troops through the countryside. Musso was killed on 31 October while trying to escape custody. Amir and 300 rebel soldiers were captured by Siliwangi troops on 1 December. Some 35,000 people were later arrested. It is thought perhaps 8,000 people were killed in the affair. As part of a second major military offensive against the Republic, on 19 December Dutch troops occupied Yogyakarta city and the Republican government was captured, including Sukarno, Hatta, Agus Salim, and Sjahrir. Republican forces withdrew to the countryside beginning a full-scale guerrilla war on either side of the van Mook line. Rather than risk their release, the army killed Amir and fifty other leftist prisoners as it withdrew from Yogyakarta that evening.

== See also ==
- First Amir Sjarifuddin Cabinet
- Second Amir Sjarifuddin Cabinet
- Madiun Affair

== Notes ==
Political offices
Preceded by Sutan Sjahrir	Prime Minister of Indonesia; 3 July 1947 – 29 January 1948	Succeeded by Mohammad Hatta
Preceded by Supriyadi	Minister of Defense; 1945–1948	Succeeded by Hamengkubuwono IX
New office	Minister of Information; 1945–1946	Succeeded by Mohammad Natsir
