= Jong Java =

Dutch East Indies youth organization

Young Java
- Jong Java
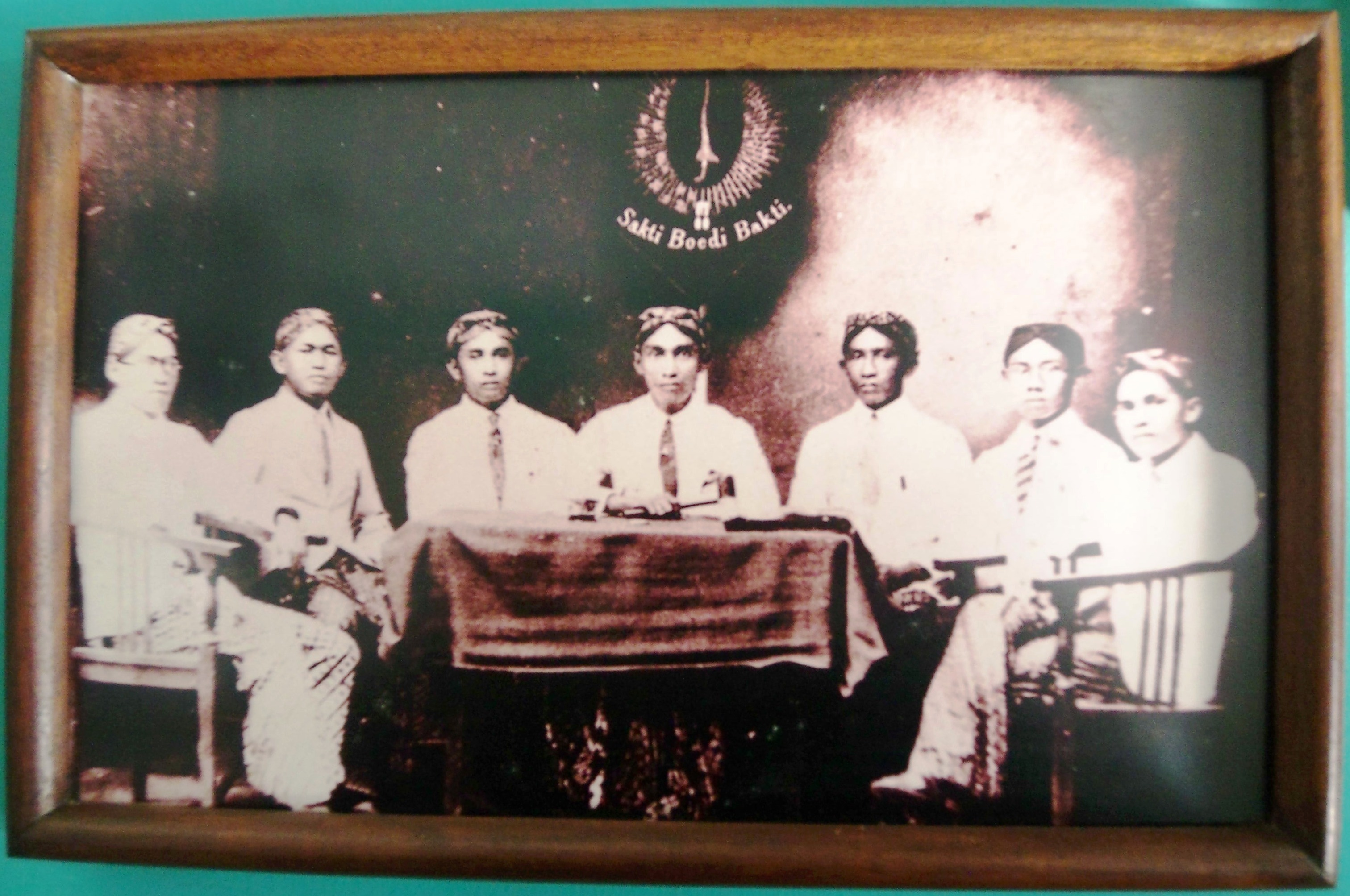
- Jong Java founders
- Merged into: Indonesia Moeda
- Formation: March 7, 1915
- Founder: Satiman Wirjosandjojo, et al.
- Founded at: Batavia, Dutch East Indies
- Dissolved: December 27, 1929
- Region served: Java
- Official language: Javanese

Jong Java, 'Young Java', was a Dutch East Indies youth organization founded on March 7, 1915, by Satiman Wirjosandjojo at the STOVIA building under the name Tri Koro Dharmo ('Three Noble Goals'). It was founded in response to the perceived elitism of the Budi Utomo movement by many young people at the time.

== Three Noble Goals ==
Tri Koro Dharmo's 3 Goals are Sakti, Budi, and Bakti (Power and intelligence, wisdom and affection).

== History ==
=== 1915–1921 ===
Tri Koro Dharmo was founded with Dr. Satiman Wirjosandjojo as chairman, Wongsonegoro as vice chairman, Sutomo as secretary, and Muslich, Mosodo, and Abdul Rahman as members. The goals of Tri Koro Dharmo were to unite the pribumi students, promote the arts and national language, and improve the general knowledge of its members. To achieve these goals, their activities included organizing meetings and courses, establishing scholarship funds, organizing art performances, and publishing the magazine Tri Koro Dharmo.

On June 12, 1918, Tri Koro Dharmo was renamed to Jong Java during its first congress in Solo, which was intended to attract new members from among the Sundanese, Madurese, and Balinese ethnic groups. In 1921, there were efforts to merge Jong Java with Jong Sumatranen Bond, which did not succeed.

Since the majority of members were Javanese students, the organization was highly influenced by Javanese culture, and its second congress held in Yogyakarta in 1919 had few attendees who did not speak the Javanese language. Major issues discussed in the congress included:

- Militia of Indonesia
- Democratization of the Javanese language
- Higher education
- The role of Sundanese women in society
- Sundanese history
- The position of the Javanese establishment in the people's movement

In 1920, the third congress was held in Solo, Central Java, and in 1921, the fourth congress was held in Bandung, West Java. Both congresses aimed to realize Jawa Raya (Great Java) and promote unity between the ethnic groups in Indonesia.

=== 1921–1929 ===
In 1922, Jong Java held its fifth congress in Solo, in which it reaffirmed its position as a non-political organization and that it would not be involved in political actions.

However, in practice, the organization was strongly influenced by the political organization Sarekat Islam, headed by Haji Agus Salim. In the 1924 congress, the increasing influence of Sarekat Islam resulted in the departure of several prominent members, who then founded the Jong Islamieten Bond.

By 1925, Jong Java had become broader in scope and become involved in the Indonesian independence movement. In 1928, the organization merged with Pemuda Indonesia and Jong Sumatera into a new organization named Indonesia Moeda, 'Young Indonesia', headed by Jong Java chairman R. Koentjoro Poerbopranoto. On December 27, 1929, Jong Java was officially dissolved.

== See also ==
- Jong Sumatranen Bond
