= Endun Abdul Karim =

Indonesian engineer and civil servant

- Abdul Karim as minister

2nd Minister of Transportation
- In office 14 November 1945 – 2 October 1946
- Prime Minister: Sutan Sjahrir
- Preceded by: Abikusno Tjokrosujoso
- Succeeded by: Djuanda Kartawidjaja

Personal details
- Born: 16 July 1908 Cirebon, Dutch East Indies

Endun Abdul Karim (also spelled Abdulkarim; 16 July 1908 – ?) was an Indonesian engineer and civil servant. He served as the country's second Minister of Transportation under prime minister Sutan Sjahrir from November 1945 to October 1946.

== Early life and career ==
Karim was born in Cirebon, in West Java, on 16 July 1908. He studied at a colonial school for natives (Hollandsch-Inlandsche School), MULO (middle school), and an AMS (secondary school) in Yogyakarta. He then studied engineering at the Bandung Technical School, and graduated as part of the class of 1933.

== Career ==
After graduating from Bandung, Karim began to work as a teacher (later headmaster) at a private high school in Surakarta, remaining there until 1939. He briefly worked as a project engineer in Batavia from 1939 to 1941 before returning to teaching, this time at the AMS in Yogyakarta. Following the Japanese invasion of the Dutch East Indies, he joined Jakarta's public works department as an engineer and later becoming the department's head.

=== In government ===
On 14 November 1945, Karim was appointed as Minister of Transportation in the First Sjahrir Cabinet. Karim was a personal friend of the prime minister, Sutan Sjahrir. Three days after his appointment, Karim accompanied Sjahrir and other ministers to a meeting with Dutch political leaders in Indonesia arranged by British general Philip Christison. After nationalist youths in Bandung seized control of railway offices there, Karim was dispatched to Bandung to officiate the formation of a new government body managing railways. Karim would retain his office in the Second Sjahrir Cabinet sworn in on 12 March 1946, but was not part of the Third Sjahrir Cabinet.

He continued to work in the Indonesian government during the Indonesian National Revolution. At some point during the revolution, he was part of the leadership committee of the People's Security Agency in the Bandung area. He was an advisor to the Indonesian delegation in negotiations with the Dutch, and at one point was appointed secretary general of the ministry until he was honorably discharged from the office on 27 August 1949. After the revolution, Karim was appointed director by the Indonesian partner of the Dutch firm NV. Javastaal Stokvis. The company was nationalized by the Indonesian government and merged with other companies to form the state-owned P.N. Sinar Bhakti, which Karim was appointed president director of in 1961. He was discharged from this post in 1964 by Presidential Decree. He was recorded as still being an active author in 1973.
