= Harmani =

Indonesian politician (1900–1951)

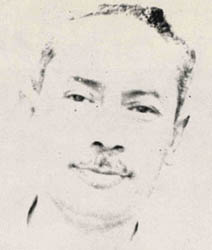

Deputy Minister of Home Affairs
- In office 19 August 1945 – 12 March 1946
- Minister: Wiranatakusumah V Sutan Sjahrir

Personal details
- Born: 15 February 1900 Blitar, Dutch East Indies
- Died: 3 October 1951 (aged 51) Bandung, West Java, Indonesia

Harmani (15 February 1900 – 3 October 1951) was an Indonesian civil servant and politician. He served as the country's first Deputy Minister of Home Affairs immediately after its independence from August 1945 until March 1946. He had previously served in various local government executive and legislative positions in East Java during the Dutch East Indies period, and would become a member of the Central Indonesian National Committee and the Provisional House of Representatives following his cabinet tenure.

== Early life and career ==
Harmani was born in Blitar, in present-day East Java, on 15 February 1900. He was educated at a native elementary school (Hollandsch-Inlandsche School) and then at an OSVIA (school for potential native civil servants). After graduating in 1919, he was assigned to various positions in the colonial government of East Java, mostly as an assistant/adjutant to district chiefs and other colonial officials. By 1931, he had been appointed as a district chief in Rogojampi (today in Banyuwangi Regency), which was his last office before he left for further education in the Netherlands in 1933. He studied law at Leiden University and Utrecht University, receiving a Master of Laws (Mr.) title and returning to Indonesia in 1936.

== Career ==
=== Dutch and Japanese periods ===
Upon his return from the Netherlands, Harmani returned to his position in Rogojampi before being assigned as the assistant to the Resident of Bojonegoro. He was reassigned as district chief in Blitar in 1937, and in 1939 moved again to Mojokerto. On 13 January 1941, he was appointed Patih of Mojokerto. He was also active in politics, and was elected as a deputy in the local council of Kediri and later to the provincial legislature of East Java in 1937. He resigned from this post in April 1939 when he was elected to the Volksraad, however, he ended up not taking his Volksraad seat due to his appointment in Mojokerto. He retained his position in Mojokerto during the Japanese occupation.

=== Post-independence ===
Following the proclamation of Indonesian independence in August 1945, Harmani was appointed into the country's first-ever cabinet as deputy minister of home affairs under with Wiranatakusumah V becoming minister. He retained this office in the ensuing cabinet under Prime Minister Sutan Sjahrir, who also held the office of home affairs minister. The position of deputy minister of home affairs was removed from Sjahrir's second cabinet which was formed on 12 March 1946, and Harmani was not given a cabinet post. He continued to work within the home affairs ministry, however, at one point holding the office of head of the decentralization division.

Harmani also became a member of the Central Indonesian National Committee, and later also part of its 46-member working committee. Along with other members of the working committee, Harmani also became a member of the Provisional House of Representatives upon its formation in 1950. As a legislator, Harmani argued for increased foreign trade and for the government to protect importers. Politically, Harmani joined the Great Indonesia Unity Party (PIR) led by Wongsonegoro, becoming the party's vice-chair and head of its political bureau. Harmani was the leader of PIR's parliamentary faction up until his death.

He died on the morning of 3 October 1951 in Bandung due to diabetes and kidney problems. By the time of his death, he had received medical treatment for the illnesses for around six months.
