= Our Struggle =

1945 pamphlet by Soetan Sjahrir

One Struggle
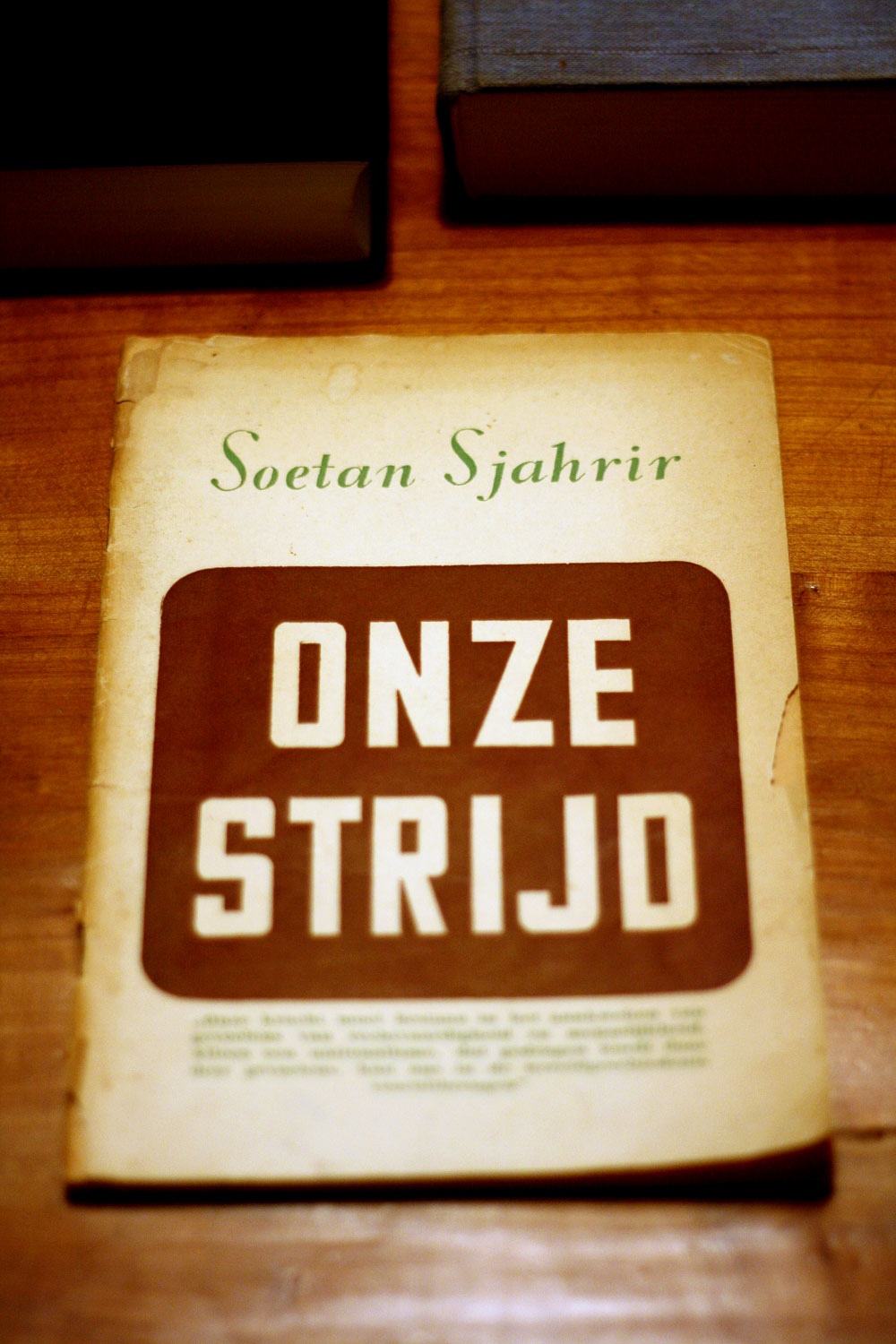
- Front cover of Onze Strijd, 2nd edition (1946)
- Author: Soetan Sjahrir
- Original title: Onze Strijd
- Language: Dutch
- Genre: Political pamphlet
- Publisher: Vrij Nederland
- Publication date: 1945, 1946
- Publication place: Netherlands
- English publication date: 1949
- Media type: Booklet

"Our Struggle" was a pamphlet written late October 1945 by Indonesian independence leader Soetan Sjahrir. It was pivotal in redirecting the Indonesian national revolution.

In his pamphlet Sjahrir addressed all crucial spearheads of the still ongoing revolutionary struggle for Indonesia's independence. His target audiences are firstly and primarily the Indonesian masses and their leaders involved in the revolution, secondly public opinion in the colonial metropolis of the Netherlands, home of the adversary and thirdly international public opinion.

The Dutch-language editions of 1946 contain opening words by Perhimpoenan Indonesia and were used to sway Dutch public opinion during the Linggadjati negotiations. Its English translation was distributed at Westminster Hall to the British delegates to the United Nations.

Sjahrir's writings successfully countered the myth that the Indonesian republic was the brainchild of the fascist imperial Japanese forces and not a deep national desire.

== Context ==
After the defeat of the Empire of Japan and de facto end of World War II, the capitulated and disillusioned Japanese Army and Navy in the former Dutch colony of the Dutch East Indies retreat to their barracks and await relief by Allied forces. Before the postponed arrival of Allied forces and their demobilisation the Japanese troops remain responsible to guard their former Allied POW's and European civilian prisoners.

August 1945 Indonesian leaders are pressured by revolutionary youth groups, to unilaterally declare the independent Republic of Indonesia. Within a few months the power vacuum left by retreating Japanese forces and the gradually arriving Allied forces explodes into full scale revolutionary tension. Social outgroups that next to Dutch people, include Chinese Indonesians, Dutch-Indonesian Eurasians, and Christian Indonesians such as the Depok, Ambonese and Menadonese people fall victim to violent atrocities.

A chaotic time of extreme aggression erupts that is remembered by the Dutch and Indo European victims as the Bersiap period. Sjahrir was the first leader to strongly oppose and condemn the violence committed against (fellow) citizens.

== Author ==
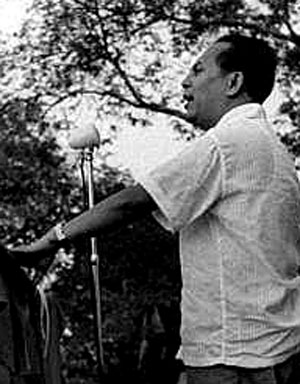
Public speaker Soetan Sjahrir

After writing this pamphlet Sjahrir joined Sukarno and Hatta, the president and vice-president of the unilaterally declared republic of Indonesia as their first prime-minister. While Sukarno and Hatta were accused of having collaborated with the Axis forces and being puppets of the Japanese military, Sjahrir's reputation as anti-fascist and resistance leader enabled him to engage in the original negotiations with the returning Dutch colonial administration as well as the later Linggadjati negotiations.

"Perhaps the high point of his career was the publication of his pamphlet 'Our Struggle'. Whoever reads that pamphlet today can scarcely comprehend what it demanded in insight and courage. For it appeared at a moment when the Indonesian masses, brought to the boiling point by the Japanese occupation and civil war, sought release in racist and other hysterical outbursts. Sjahrir's pamphlet went directly against this, and many must have felt his call for chivalry, for the understanding of other ethnic groups, as a personal attack." Sol Tas.

== Content ==
The pamphlet's content consists of a level headed analysis of the early situation of the revolution and clear recommendations for its successful continuation. Sjahrir warns against the negative effect the extreme violence has on the goodwill of international public opinion. Sjahrir clarifies the intense impact Japanese indoctrination has had on the Indonesian people, especially the youth (Indonesian: Pemuda). To deflect the ever growing hatred of the Japanese by the Indonesian people, the Japanese propaganda singled out ethnic target groups for persecution: westerners, Chinese Indonesians, Indo people (Eurasians), Menadonese people and Ambonese people. By the end of the Japanese occupation practices such as mandatory forced labour (Japanese: Romusha), that on average killed 80% of the Indonesian coolies, caused Indonesia’s rural and urban communities to become impoverished, dislocated, in uproar and disarray. Sjahrir explains Indonesians will never accept any form of colonisation ever again.

== Publications ==
In 1945 the Dutch-language pamphlet was originally written by Sjahrir in Jakarta, immediately thereafter translated into the Indonesian language as 'Perdjoeangan Kita' (Our Struggle). A Dutch-language book with his preliminary thoughts named "Indonesische overpeinzingen" (Indonesian musings) was published that same year by publisher Bezige Bij, Amsterdam.

In 1946 a first edition of 9,000 pamphlets and second edition of an additional 8,000 pamphlets was printed in the Netherlands by 'Cloeck & Moedigh', published in the Dutch language by Uitgevery 'Vrij Nederland' Amsterdam under the auspices of Perhimpoenan Indonesia.

In 1949 his book was translated into the English language by Charles Wolf Jr. and named 'Out of Exile' published by John Day, New York. The later English version contains a considerable amount of additional text.

== Quotes ==
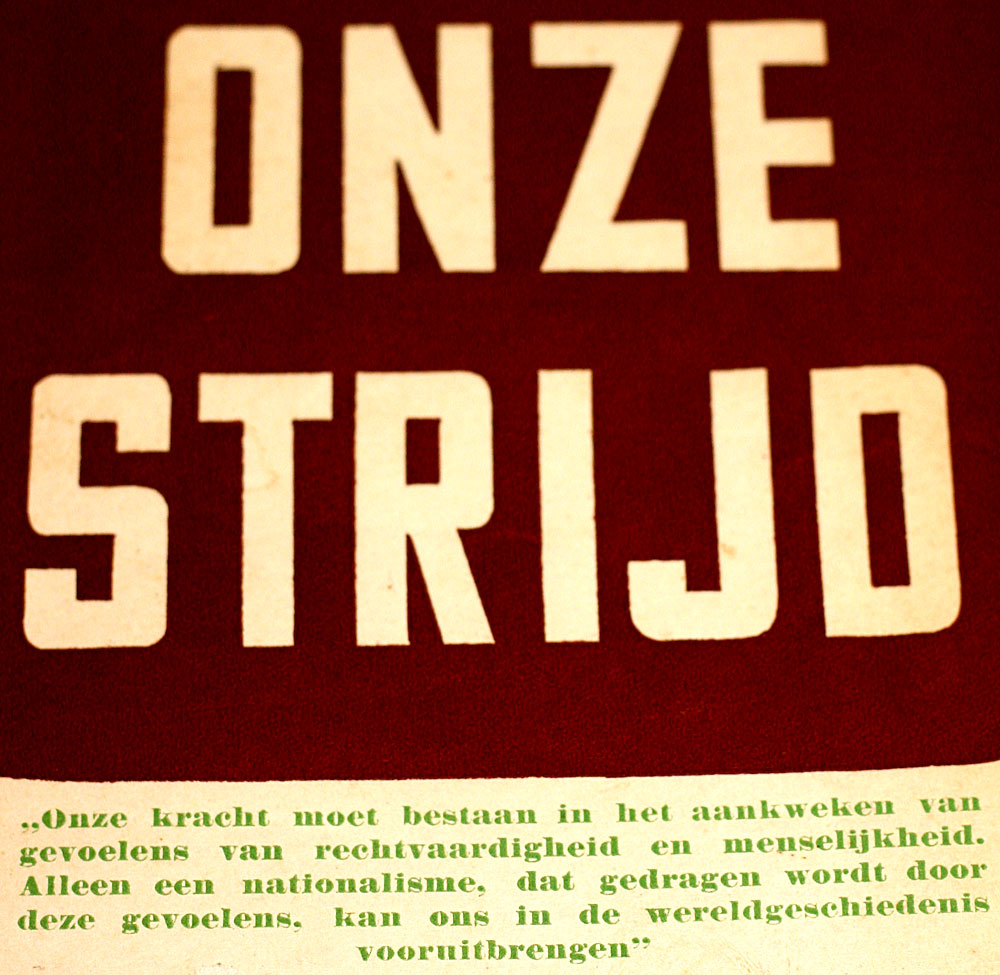
'Onze Strijd' Quote on Bookcover.

Our strength must exist in cultivating feelings of justice and humanity. Only a nationalism that is founded in these feelings will take us further in world history.

A national revolution is only the result of a democratic revolution, and nationalism should be second to democracy. The State of Indonesia is only a name we give to the essence we intend and aim for.

From the start the world had been sympathetic towards our national struggle. Public opinion [...] was on our side, however recent developments show our peoples disarray and can't be accepted as features of our struggle for freedom, [..] distrust, features of fascist cruelty [...] particularly the murder and cruelty aimed at Indos, Ambonese, and Menadonese who in any case still are our fellow countrymen.

This hatred towards Indos, Ambonese, Menadonese can only be explained as a lack of national consciousness among the masses of our people.

Until now we have not taken the satisfactory political position towards these groups (Indo-Europeans, Indo-Asians, Ambonese, Menadonese and others). In fact things have happened that are plain wrong (and must be condemned) and detrimental to our revolution.

Hatred against minorities and foreigners are a hidden factor in any nationalist struggle..., but a nationalist movement that lets itself be carried away by xenophobia will in the end find the whole world against itself. The nationalist movement ... will demise in self-destruction.

=== Pages ===
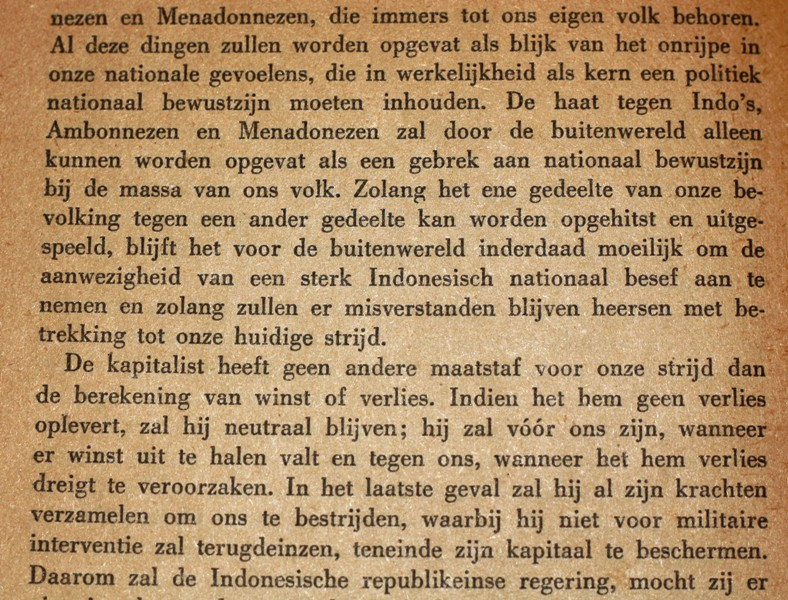
'Onze Strijd' Page 16

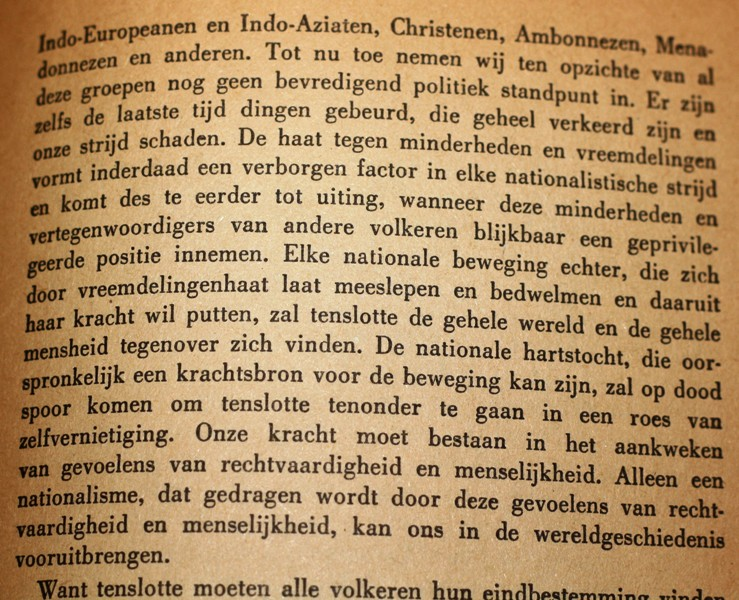
'Onze Strijd' Page 27

== See also ==
- Bersiap
- Sutan Sjahrir
- List of prime ministers of Indonesia
- Sjahrir I Cabinet
- Sjahrir II Cabinet
- Sjahrir III Cabinet
