= Boentaran Martoatmodjo =

Indonesian politician (1896–1979)

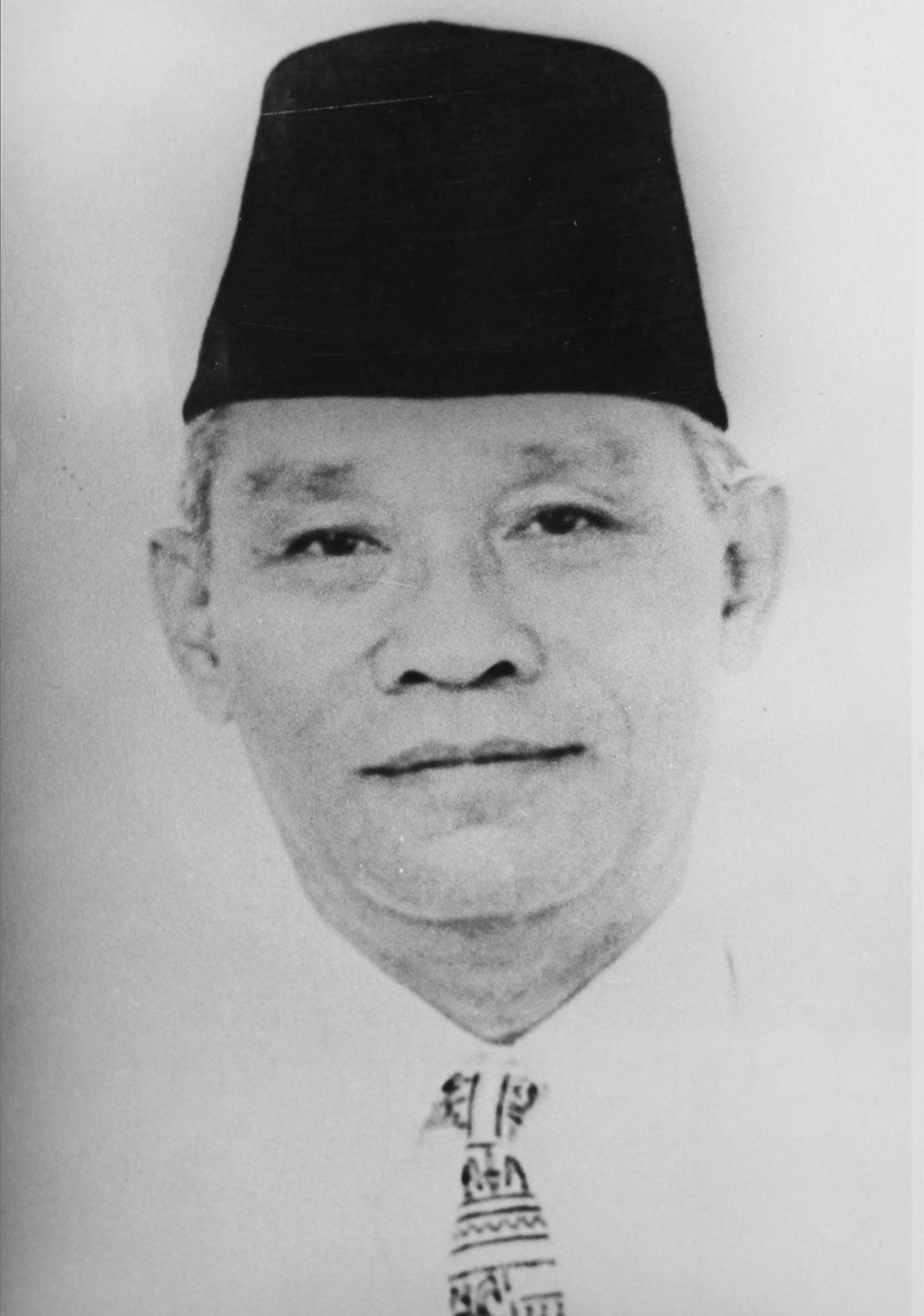

1st Minister of Health
- In office 4 September 1945 – 14 November 1945
- President: Sukarno
- Preceded by: Position created
- Succeeded by: Darma Setiawan

Personal details
- Born: 1 November 1896 Purworejo, Dutch East Indies
- Died: 4 October 1979 (aged 83) Jakarta, Indonesia

Raden Boentaran Martoatmodjo (11 January 1896 – 4 October 1979) was an Indonesian physician and politician. He served as the first Minister of Health following the country's independence from September to November 1945, and was previously a member of the Investigating Committee for Preparatory Work for Independence.

Educated at the STOVIA medical school and later Leiden University, Martoatmodjo spent much of his colonial-era medical career in Semarang and became head of the city's public hospital by the time of the Japanese invasion. He had a good relationship with the Japanese occupation forces, and was appointed to multiple Japanese-formed organizations during the war. Appointed health minister in the first cabinet, he founded the Indonesian Red Cross during his two-month tenure. Martoatmodjo would be arrested for taking part in a coup attempt in 1946, and was released in 1948.

== Early life and career ==
Boentaran Martoatmodjo was born on 11 January 1896 in the village of Loano, in present-day Purworejo Regency. Due to his family being Javanese nobility, he could enroll at an Europeesche Lagere School (European elementary school), and continued his education at STOVIA, graduating at the age of 22 in 1918. After graduating from STOVIA, Martoatmodjo briefly worked at a colonial government health office in Semarang.

In 1919, he was sent to Banjarmasin to handle a cholera outbreak. He remained in Borneo for several years, taking part in an expedition to Tanjung Selor and being assigned as a doctor in Laut Island from 1920–1921. He was assigned in Samarinda in 1921–1922 before leaving Borneo, working at the medical office covering Bali, Lombok, and parts of East Java until 1928 when he left to pursue further studies at Leiden University in the Netherlands. He joined the Perhimpoenan Indonesia while in Leiden, and returned to Indonesia after graduating in 1931.

== Career ==
=== Colonial period ===
Upon his return, Martoatmodjo worked as a physician at the Centrale Burgerlijke Ziekeninrichting (CDZ/Central Civil Hospital, today Dr. Cipto Mangunkusumo Hospital) in Batavia. He moved to Semarang in 1932, initially to handle a leprosy outbreak before he took on a post as a municipal doctor there until 1938. Briefly returning to Batavia in 1938, he became a resident doctor in Purwokerto that year until he returned to Semarang to become head of the city's public hospital in 1941. Shortly before the Japanese invasion of the Dutch East Indies, Martoatmodjo had joined the "Independent Indonesia Committee" group in Semarang, which held daily meetings at the CDZ and aimed to support the Japanese invasion with the ultimate goal of Indonesian independence. The Committee would be disbanded following the Japanese takeover, and Martoatmodjo instead joined the Center of the People's Power (Putera) propaganda organization.

Martoatmodjo maintained a good personal relationship with Japanese officers in the Semarang area (due to him helping a group of injured Japanese soldiers following an accident), which allowed CDZ to function as a center of Indonesian nationalist activities in Semarang. Martoatmodjo was also close to Japanese navy admiral and Indonesian independence supporter Tadashi Maeda. He further joined the Central Advisory Council as deputy leader under Rajiman Wediodiningrat. Within the council, he pushed for an inquiry into food supply of the population, which had been severely reduced by Japanese wartime procurement. Other organizations Martoatmodjo took part in during wartime included a war victims aid committee and an air raid precaution organization, along with the leadership of the paramilitary youth organization Suishintai.

Close to the end of the war, Martoatmodjo was appointed into the Investigating Committee for Preparatory Work for Independence (BPUPK). In BPUPK, he pushed for public health to be included as a clause in the drafted Constitution of Indonesia, though it was ultimately rejected by other members. He remained in Jakarta around August 1945 as the Japanese surrender became imminent.

=== Post-independence ===
On 4 September 1945, the first Indonesian cabinet was formed, in which Martoatmodjo was appointed as Minister of Health. President Sukarno shortly after ordered Martoatmodjo to form an Indonesian branch of the Red Cross, and by 5 September Martoatmodjo had appointed a five-member committee to set up the organization. The Indonesian Red Cross was formally established on 17 September 1945, with vice president Mohammad Hatta as its first chairman. Martoatmodjo also worked with the newly formed People's Security Army (TKR) and sent a proclamation to Indonesian medical personnel ordering them to work with TKR to organize the army's health department. On 14 November 1945, the cabinet was replaced by the First Sjahrir Cabinet under prime minister Sutan Sjahrir, and Martoatmodjo was replaced by Darma Setiawan as health minister.

By mid-1946, Martoatmodjo had joined a growing movement of opposition against Sjahrir, which by late June had kidnapped Sjahrir in a coup attempt later known as the 3 July affair. The coup group appointed Martoatmodjo into a proposed "Political Leadership Council" which were to replace Sjahrir, but the coup failed as its military leader Sudarsono was arrested after attempting to confront President Sukarno with the group's demands. The group's leaders, including Martoatmodjo, would be arrested. He would be released on prison following an amnesty by Sukarno commemorating the third anniversary of the proclamation in August 1948.

Martoatmodjo would briefly serve as a member of the Provisional House of Representatives, being sworn in on 20 February 1954. He also worked for some time at the National Development Planning Agency in 1959. He died on 3 October 1979, and would be posthumously awarded the Star of Mahaputera, 2nd class in 1992.
