= Djuanda Kartawidjaja =

Indonesian politician and technocrat (1911–1963)

Raden Djuanda Kartawidjaja
- Official portrait, c. 1962

11th Prime Minister of Indonesia
- In office 9 April 1957 – 6 July 1959
- President: Sukarno
- Deputy: Idham Chalid; Hardi; Johannes Leimena
- Preceded by: Ali Sastroamidjojo
- Succeeded by: Abolished (de jure); Sukarno (de facto)
Ministerial offices
11th Minister of Finance
In office 10 July 1959 – 1 July 1960
President	Sukarno
Preceded by	Sutikno Slamet
Succeeded by	Notohamiprodjo
10th Minister of Defense
In office 9 April 1957 – 6 July 1959
President	Sukarno
Prime Minister	Himself
Preceded by	Ali Sastroamidjojo
Succeeded by	Abdul Haris Nasution
3rd Minister of Transportation
In office 6 September 1950 – 30 July 1953
President	Sukarno
Preceded by	Mananti Sitompul
Succeeded by	Abikoesno Tjokrosoejoso
In office 2 October 1946 – 4 August 1949
President	Sukarno
Preceded by	Endun Abdul Karim
Succeeded by	Herling Laoh
Minister of Public Works
Acting
In office 29 January 1948 – 4 August 1949
President	Sukarno
Preceded by	Herling Laoh
Succeeded by	Herling Laoh

Personal details
- Born: 14 January 1911 Tasikmalaya, Preanger Residency, Dutch East Indies
- Died: 7 November 1963 (aged 52) Jakarta, Indonesia
- Party: Independent
- Spouse: Julia Virzsia (m. 1933)
- Children: 5
- Parents: Raden Kartawidjaja (father); Nyi Monat (mother)
- Relatives: Awaloedin Djamin (son in law)
- Education: Technische Hoogeschool te Bandoeng (Ir.)
- Occupation: Politician; engineer

Raden Djuanda Kartawidjaja (EYD: Juanda Kartawijaya; 14 January 1911 – 7 November 1963), was an Indonesian politician and technocrat who held various ministerial offices during the presidency of Sukarno, most notably as prime minister from 1957 to 1959, and first minister from 1959 until his death in 1963.

Born into a noble ethnic Sundanese family, he graduated in engineering at the Technische Hoogeschool te Bandoeng in Bandung. He then worked as a teacher and later an engineer. Following the proclamation of Indonesian Independence in 1945, he joined the newly formed Republican government and served in several cabinets, mostly in economic portfolios. In 1957, Djuanda was appointed prime minister by Sukarno following the inability of the parties to form a cabinet. As prime minister, he is remembered for his role in proclaiming the Djuanda Declaration. On 10 July 1959, four days after Djuanda's resignation, Sukarno appointed himself prime minister but retained Djuanda as first minister with much the same duties as before. Even though, Djuanda is still recognized as the last Prime Minister of Indonesia officially. He died in 1963.

Djuanda's death and the abolition of the post of Prime Minister in the Indonesian Republican system allowed far greater power to be exercised by the President, now being given full ruling power with minimal oversight, as both Head of State and Head of Government. This had an enormous impact on Indonesian politics, allowing the constitutional legality of the autocracy of Sukarno and Suharto, also contributing to the absence of an economic policy in the later years of Sukarno's Guided Democracy.

Since his death, various landmarks have been named in his honor, including Juanda International Airport in Surabaya, and Juanda railway station in Jakarta. He is also depicted in 2016 and 2022 edition of the Rp 50,000 Indonesian rupiah banknotes.

== Early life and career ==
Djuanda Kartawidjaja was born on 14 January 1911, in Tasikmalaya, Preanger Regencies Residency, Dutch East Indies (now Tasikmalaya Regency, Indonesia). His family was of ethnic Sundanese noble descent. His father, Raden Kartawidjaja, was a young teacher, while his mother, Nyi Monat, was a housewife. He also has 3 brothers and 2 sisters. In his childhood, Djuanda Kartawidjaja went to elementary school at the Hogere Burger School (HBS). Then he transferred to the Europesche Lagere School (ELS). After that, he continued to the Technische Hoogeschool te Bandoeng (now the Bandung Institute of Technology), majoring in civil engineering. While a student, he was also active in non-political organizations such as the Paguyuban Pasundan and Muhammadiyah organizations. He graduated from the Bandung Institute of Technology in 1933.

He became a teacher at a Muhammadiyah Islamic School in Batavia (now Jakarta), eventually becoming the principal of the school. In 1937, he became an engineer in the West Java Water Conservancy Bureau. In 1939, he became a senior advisor to the bureau. In addition, he also actively participated in the work of the Batavia Municipal Council. In 1942, the Japanese Empire invaded and occupied the Dutch East Indies. The Japanese changed Batavia to its current name Jakarta. In the same year, Juanda participated in the Jakarta City Council election but was not elected.

== National revolution ==
In 1943, the Japanese appointed Indonesian advisors (sanyo) to the administration and appointed nationalist leader Sukarno leader of a new Central Advisory Board (Chuo Sani-kai) in Jakarta. On 7 August, the day after the atomic bombing of Hiroshima, the Preparatory Committee for Indonesian Independence (Indonesian: Panitia Persiapan Kemerdekaan Indonesia) or PPKI was established. Sukarno was chairman, and Mohammad Hatta as vice chairman. On 19 August 1945, this body created 12 ministries for Indonesia's first cabinet, the Presidential Cabinet.

Djuanda was known as the "marathon minister." In the first 16 cabinets of Indonesia, he has been in the cabinet 12 times, mainly serving as Minister of Transport or Minister of Economy. He joined Prime Minister Sutan Sjahrir ’s second cabinet (formed in March 1946) as a junior minister of the Ministry of Communications. In the third cabinet of Sjahrir, he joined the cabinet again and was promoted to minister of transportation. Apart from being the Minister of Transportation, he also held other strategic positions, including the Minister of Water, Prosperity, Finance and Defense.

He was also trusted to lead Dutch negotiations, one of which was negotiations at the Round Table Conference. During the conference, Djuanda was sent to be the Chair of the Economic and Finance Committee for the Indonesian Delegation. In the negotiations, the Netherlands officially recognized the independence of the Indonesian government.

Djuanda was also entrusted to lead the Japanese Railways Bureau. This was followed by the takeover of the Mining Bureau, Municipality, Residency and military objects in North Bandung Warehouse. After carrying out this task, he was appointed Head of the Railway Bureau for the Java and Madura regions.

== Premiership ==
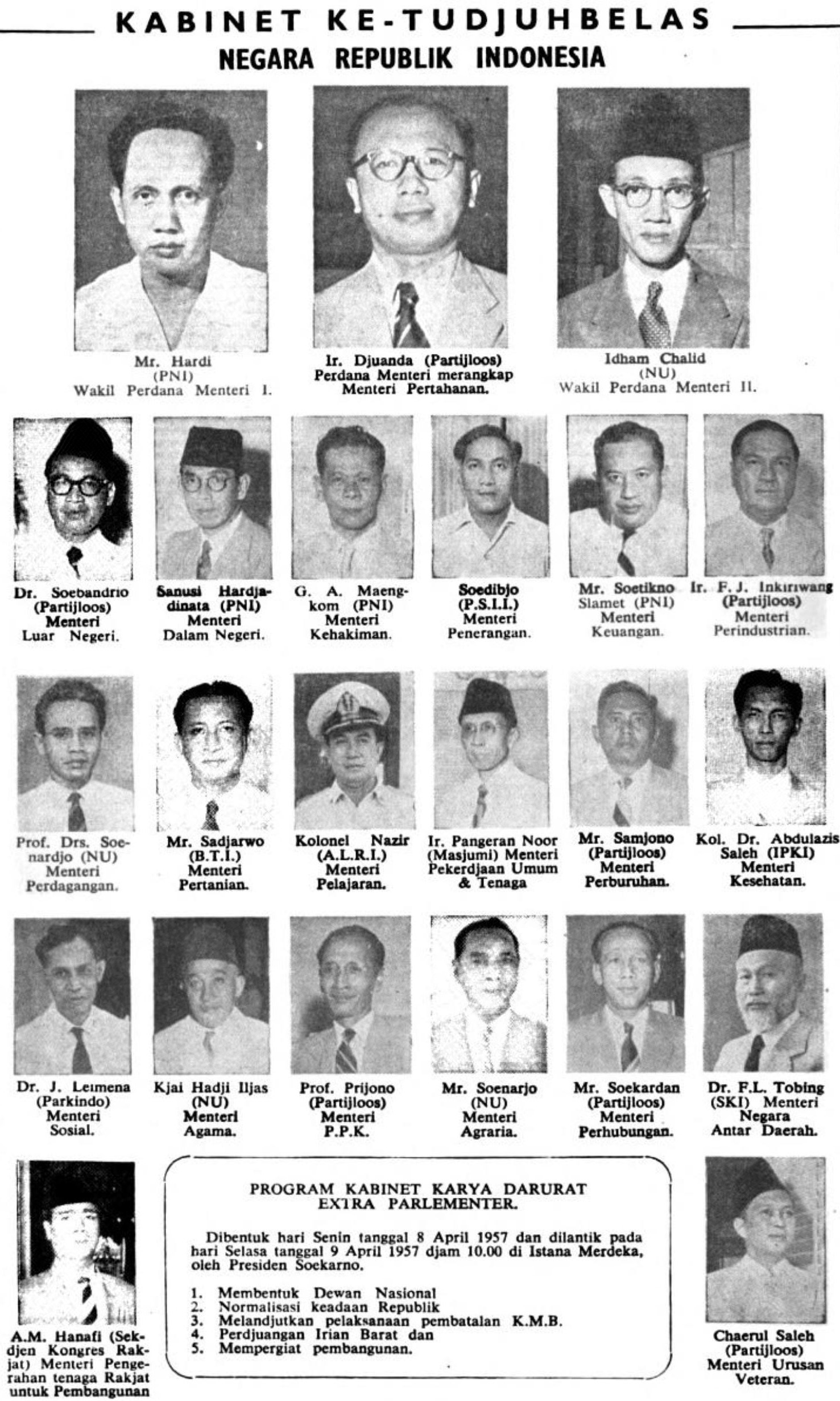
Poster showing the Djuanda Cabinet

The Djuanda Declaration was formulated on 13 December 1957 by Djuanda. This declaration stated to the world that the Indonesian seas included the seas around, between, and within the Indonesian archipelago into one unitary territory of the Republic of Indonesia, which would later be known as an archipelagic state in the United Nations Convention on the Law of the Sea (UNCLOS).

The content of the Djuanda Declaration states:

1. That the Republic of Indonesia is an archipelagic country that has its own style.
2. That since time immemorial, the Indonesian archipelago has been a single entity.
3. The provisions of the 1939 Ordinance could damage the territorial integrity of Indonesia.

The Djuanda Declaration has these purposes:

1. To realize the territory of the Republic of Indonesia which is complete and intact.
2. To determine the territorial boundaries of the Republic of Indonesia in accordance with the principles of archipelagic state.
3. To regulate peaceful shipping traffic that ensures the security and safety of the Republic of Indonesia.

This declaration became the legal basis for the drafting of a law that replaced the Teritoriale Zeeën en Maritieme Kringen Ordonantie 1939.

== Death and legacy ==
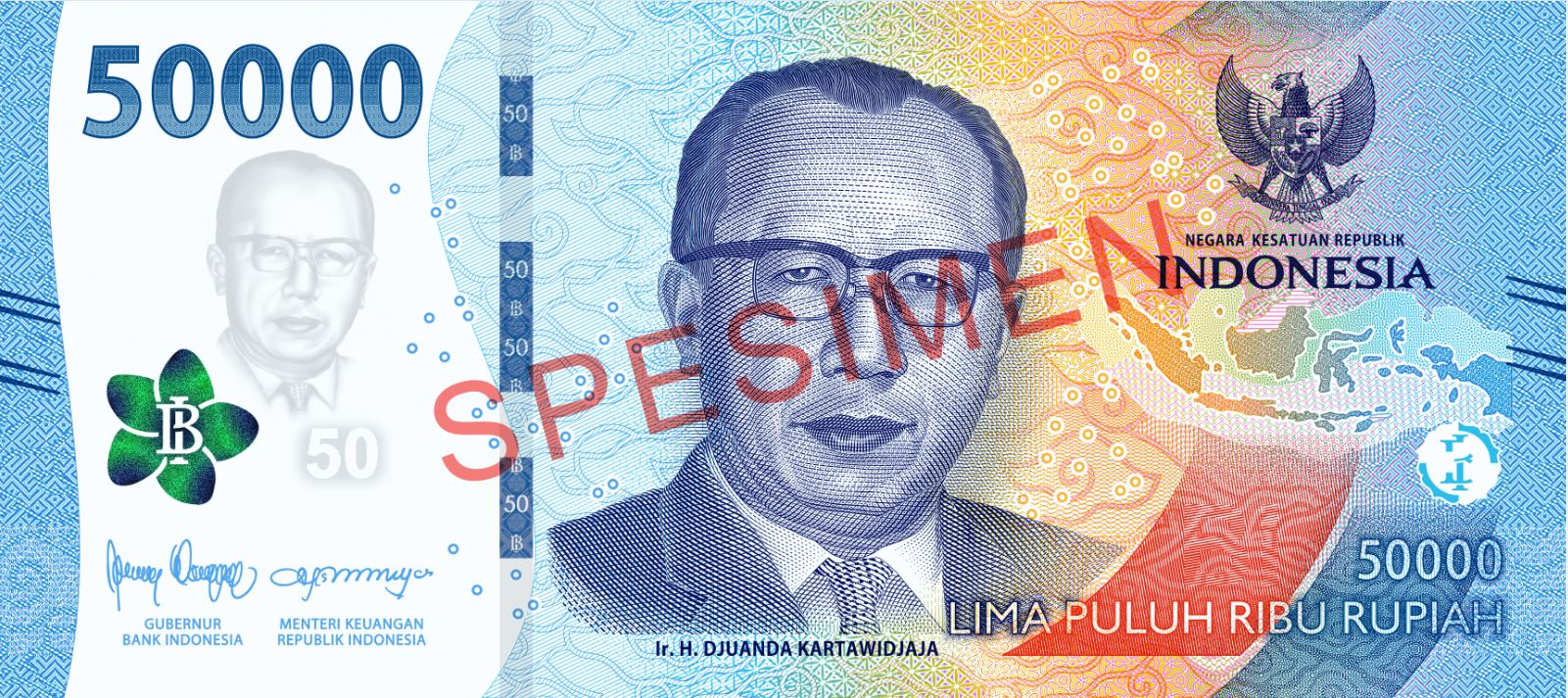
50,000 rupiah banknote featuring Djuanda Kartawidjaja, issued in 2022

On the afternoon of 6 November 1963, Djuanda went to a hotel in Jakarta, accompanied by his wife and daughter, to participate in a ceremony. He collapsed suddenly at 11:25 p.m., and his pulse stopped 20 minutes later. His personal doctor rushed to the scene and gave him artificial respiration, but it was unsuccessful. On 7 November, the Indonesian government announced that Djuanda had died of a heart attack. After his death, Djuanda was appointed a national figure based on the Presidential Decree No. 224/1963.

The Juanda International Airport, located in Surabaya, is named after him, who suggested development for the airport. Juanda railway station in Jakarta got its name from the nearby road, which is also named after him. He is also depicted in the 2016 and 2022 edition of Rp 50,000 Indonesian rupiah banknotes.

== Foreign honours ==
- Malaya: Honorary Grand Commander of the Order of the Defender of the Realm (SMN) (K) – Tun (1959)

Political offices
Preceded by Ali Sastroamidjojo	Prime Minister of Indonesia; 9 April 1957 – 6 July 1959	Succeeded by Abolished (de jure); Sukarno (de facto)
