= Surachman Tjokroadisurjo =

Indonesian politician (1894–1952)

Ir. Raden Mas Surachman Tjokroadisurjo
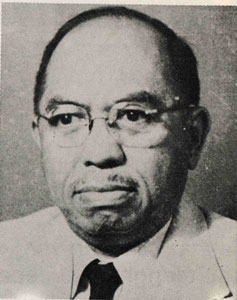
- Portrait, c. 1946

4th Minister of Finance
- In office 8 December 1945 – 2 October 1946
- Prime Minister: Sutan Sjahrir
- Preceded by: Sunarjo Kolopaking
- Succeeded by: Sjafruddin Prawiranegara

1st Minister of Welfare
- In office 19 August 1945 – 14 November 1945
- Preceded by: Office established
- Succeeded by: Darmawan Mangunkusumo

Personal details
- Born: Panji Surachman Tjokroadisurjo; 30 August 1894 Wonosobo, Dutch East Indies
- Died: 16 November 1952 (aged 58) The Hague, Netherlands
- Education: Delft Institute of Technology
- Occupation: Politician; academic

Panji Surachman Tjokroadisurjo (30 August 1894 – 16 November 1952) was an Indonesian politician and academic. He served in a number of cabinets during the Indonesian National Revolution, as the Minister of Welfare and later the Minister of Finance.

Born in Wonosobo, he studied chemical engineering at the Delft Institute of Technology in the Netherlands. He returned to the East Indies in 1920, and worked for the Dutch government until the Japanese invasion. Following the proclamation of independence, he was appointed as Minister for Economic Affairs in the Presidential Cabinet. However, he only served for two months before being appointed Minister of Finance in the First and Second Sjahrir Cabinets. He remained active in government afterwards, and was appointed as the first Rector of the University of Indonesia. He died in 1952 during a diplomatic mission to the Netherlands.

== Early life ==
Raden Mas Panji Surachman Tjokroadisurjo was born in Wonosobo, Dutch East Indies, on 30 August 1894. He was a descendant of Yogyakarta Sultan Hamengkubuwono II, and he had twelve siblings. His father, Raden Mas Tumenggung Suryoadikusumo, was the third regent of Wonosobo. His grandfather, Raden Mas Adipati Aryo Cokroadisuryo, also served as the regent of Wonosobo. He studied at an Europeesche Lagere School before continuing to a Hogere Burgerschool in Batavia. In 1915, he went to the Netherlands, where he studied chemical engineering at the Delft Institute of Technology. He graduated in 1920, and became the first Indonesian chemical engineer. Before returning to the East Indies, he briefly undertook an internship in Germany.

== Early career ==
After returning from Germany, Surachman was appointed to lead a chemical laboratory in Bandung, where he worked with batik workers and silversmiths. He had been offered a job in the police department, but Surachman refused the job. In this period, he built a relationship with Bandung-based nationalists including future President Sukarno, and Surachman was relocated to Bogor due to suspicions arising from those contacts. He was later relocated again to Yogyakarta before returning to Bogor. Due to his government work, he decided against openly supporting the nationalist movement, but he did provide donations, including helping fund the 1928 Second Youth Congress. In 1936, he was assigned to the colonial government's Economic Department in Batavia. During the Japanese occupation of the Dutch East Indies, he was first appointed as a member of the Putera organization, before his appointment as chief of the economic department in July 1945.

== Political career ==
Shortly after the proclamation of Indonesian independence, Surachman was appointed as Minister for Economic Affairs (later Minister of Welfare) on 19 August 1945 in the Presidential Cabinet. In this tenure, he announced the government economic policy which favored cooperatives, and further announced that foreign property in Indonesia would still be respected by the new government. He was replaced by Darmawan Mangunkusumo when the cabinet fell in November 1945. He was reappointed into the new cabinet led by Sutan Sjahrir as Minister of Finance to replace the sick Sunarjo Kolopaking on 8 December 1945. He retained this post in the Second Sjahrir Cabinet.

In his capacity as Finance Minister, Surachman was the first issuer of the Oeang Republik Indonesia, which was arranged to be exchanged with Japanese occupation currency at a 1,000:1 exchange rate. He also announced a 45 percent increase in the salaries of high level civil servants in order to attract skilled bureaucrats. In order to finance the government, Surachman also arranged for the first issuing of Indonesian government bonds in April 1946. The bond issue was a success, raising 80 percent of the targeted proceeds within 45 days and the full amount in less than a year. However, due to poor documentation, the Indonesian government would later default on these bonds. During this period, Surachman would often personally hold onto the government funds, storing the cash in suitcases inside his home. He was replaced as finance minister by his deputy Sjafruddin Prawiranegara on 2 October 1946 upon the formation of the Third Sjahrir Cabinet. He was still active in government affairs, and after a large-scale Dutch offensive in 1947 seized much Indonesian-held territory, he formed a private company to accommodate the now-unemployed Republican civil servants around Jakarta.

After the transfer of sovereignty in 1949, Surachman was appointed as the first Indonesian President of the University of Indonesia (UI) in 1950. In establishing the governance of the UI, he had to displace an opium processing factory in order to be able to establish his rector's office. He also lectured at the Bandung Institute of Technology. He died on 16 November 1952 in The Hague from hypertension, whilst on a diplomatic mission to negotiate the nationalization of Dutch tin mining companies in Indonesia.

== Personal life ==
Surachman married in 1922 while he was working in Bandung. His wife Sunarti was 16 at the time of their marriage, while Surachman was 37. She was the sole daughter of the regent of Grobogan at the time. They had four children, of which three daughters survived to adulthood.
