= Roosseno Soerjohadikoesoemo =

Indonesian politician, and engineer

Prof. Dr. Ir. Roosseno Soerjohadikoesoemo
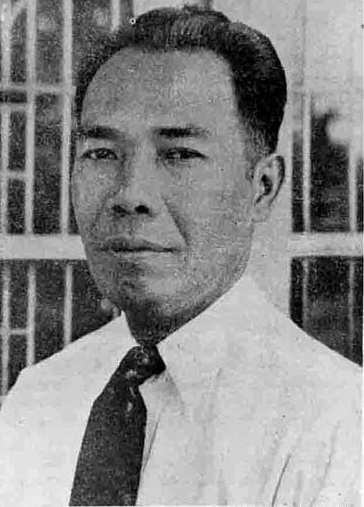
- Rooseno Soerjohadikusumo, c. 1953

12th Minister of Economic Affairs
- In office 8 November 1954 – 12 August 1955
- Prime Minister: Ali Sastroamidjojo
- Preceded by: Iskaq Tjokrohadisurjo
- Succeeded by: I.J. Kasimo

6th Minister of Transportation
- In office 12 October 1953 – 23 October 1954
- Prime Minister: Ali Sastroamidjojo
- Preceded by: Abikusno Tjokrosujoso
- Succeeded by: Adnan Kapau Gani

9th Minister of Public Works
- In office 30 July 1953 – 12 October 1953
- Prime Minister: Ali Sastroamidjojo
- Preceded by: Suwarto
- Succeeded by: Mohammad Hasan

Personal details
- Born: Roosseno Soerjohadikoesoemo; 2 August 1908 Madiun, Dutch East Indies
- Died: 15 June 1996 (aged 87) Jakarta, Indonesia
- Party: PIR
- Education: Technische Hoogeschool te Bandoeng (THB)

Roosseno Soerjohadikoesoemo (EYD: Roosseno Suryohadikusumo; 2 August 1908 – 15 June 1996) was an Indonesian politician, scholar, and engineer. He served as minister of Public Works, Transportation and Economic Affairs during the first cabinet of Prime Minister Ali Sastroamidjojo. Roosseno planned several of the most notable buildings in Jakarta, including the Hotel Indonesia, Istiqlal Mosque, and the National Monument. His extensive use of concrete as a building material led thim being dubbed Indonesia's Father of Concrete".

== Early life and education ==
Roosseno was born in Madiun, today in East Java, on 2 August 1908, as the sixth of seven children. His family was Javanese nobility, of patih rank (his father was a patih in Ngawi, and his grandfather in Ponorogo). His mother died in 1916, and he was raised by a stepmother. At age 7, he enrolled at an Europeesche Lagere School in Yogyakarta, later continuing at a Meer Uitgebreid Lager Onderwijs at Madiun (1922-1925) and an Algemene Middelbare School at Yogyakarta (1925–1928). He demonstrated an aptitude for machines during his studies at the AMS, and his teacher recommended that he become an engineer. He later enrolled at the Technische Hoogeschool/THS (today Bandung Institute of Technology) in Bandung in July 1928, and graduated with a cum laude in May 1932.

== Career ==
=== Colonial period ===
Three months after Roosseno's graduation, he founded an engineering firm along with his senior Sukarno who had recently been released from prison for political activities. Roosseno also took a job as a teaching assistant at THS. According to Sukarno's accounts, Roosseno often contributed to the firm's expenses from his supplementary income. Generally, in the firm Sukarno left the actual engineering calculations to Roosseno. The firm did not get much work, and only built a mosque and several houses in the Papandayan area. The firm was dissolved in 1933 when Sukarno was exiled to Ende.

After the dissolution of the firm, Roosseno took on work as a civil engineer in Bandung's public works department, and later was also elected into Bandung's city council representing the Great Indonesia Party. He moved to Kediri in 1939, still working as a civil engineer for the local government. According to Roosseno's accounts, shortly before the Japanese invasion of the Dutch East Indies he was ordered by the Dutch government to destroy some 150 bridges - and once the Japanese had seized Java, they ordered Roosseno to rebuild them.

During the Japanese period, Roosseno was appointed as a professor at the reopened THS (called Bandung Kogyo Daigaku during the occupation). He was also appointed into the advisory body Chuo Sangi-In, representing the Kediri region, and later also into the Investigating Committee for Preparatory Work for Independence. Roosseno created and ran a "weapons laboratory" during the Indonesian National Revolution, which focused on sabotage of bridges in particular.

=== Politics ===
As a member of the Great Indonesia Unity Party (PIR), Roosseno was appointed as a minister in the First Ali Sastroamidjojo Cabinet, initially as the Minister of Public Works. He was reassigned as Minister of Communication following a cabinet reshuffle on 12 October 1953, and then resigned as part of PIR's temporary departure from the coalition on 23 October 1954. He later rejoined the cabinet as Minister of Economic Affairs on 8 November 1954. As Economic Minister, Roosseno started a number of measures which tightened controls on foreign trade and banks. Roosseno also chaired the Economic Committee of the Bandung Conference in 1955.

=== Architecture ===
During the Dutch period, Roosseno wrote a number of articles in the journal De Ingenieur in Ned. Indie, covering the use of reinforced concrete. He went to France in 1955 to study prestressed concrete, which strongly inspired him. Roosseno planned a number of the most notable buildings in Jakarta, including Hotel Indonesia, the Istiqlal Mosque, and the National Monument (which was Roosseno's first use of prestressed concrete). Due to Roosseno's extensive use of concrete in his designs, he was nicknamed "Indonesia's Father of Concrete". Although Roosseno was close to Sukarno, he was largely unaffected by Sukarno's fall from power. Roosseno remained as an engineering consultant, with his own firm in Jakarta, and perhaps Indonesia's best-respected civil engineer until near his death.

In the research world, while Roosseno became a member of the executive board of the Indonesian Organization for Scientific Research in 1951 and 1953, he remained in private practice. This was due to the low pay offered by academic institutions, and Roosseno only served as professor extraordinarius in Bandung.

== Personal life and family ==
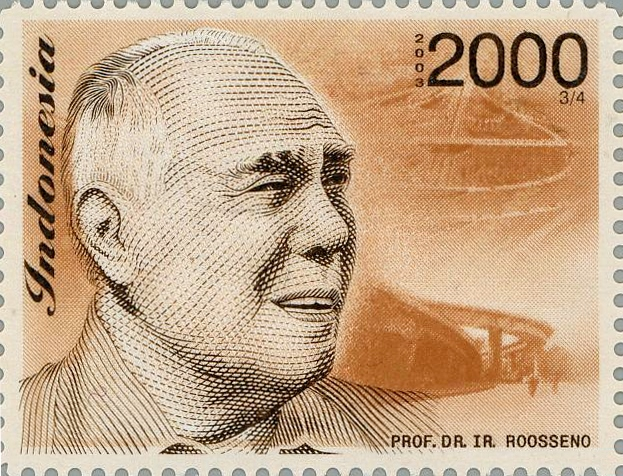
Roosseno on a 2003 stamp of Indonesia

Roosseno was married to R.A. Oentari and had six children, with Sukarno acting as the matchmaker for the couple's marriage in 1932. In the wedding ceremony, Sukarno asked for permission to give a speech, and while the bride's mother had doubts, he was permitted to speak and Sukarno ended up giving an agitating speech with nationalistic undertones. After Oentari's death, Roosseno remarried a Christian woman and converted to Christianity.

He died on 15 June 1996. After his body was given Christian funerary rites, the body was then driven to a mosque, where Roosseno was posthumously converted back to Islam before he was buried at Karet Bivak Cemetery.
