= Mangunkusumo =

Mangunkusumo is a surname. Notable people with the surname include:

- Cipto Mangunkusumo, Indonesian independence leader
- Darmawan Mangunkusumo, Indonesian economist, engineer, and politician

== See also ==
- Dr. Cipto Mangunkusumo Hospital
