= Soewandi =

Minister of Education
- In office 2 October 1946 – 3 July 1947
- Prime Minister: Sutan Sjahrir
- Preceded by: Muhammad Sjafei
- Succeeded by: Ali Sastroamidjojo

Minister of Justice
- In office 14 November 1945 – 22 June 1946
- Prime Minister: Sutan Sjahrir
- Preceded by: Soepomo
- Succeeded by: Susanto Tirtoprodjo

Personal details
- Born: 31 October 1898 Ngawi, Dutch East Indies
- Died: 6 March 1964 (aged 65) Jakarta, Indonesia

Raden Soewandi (31 October 1898 – 6 March 1964) was an Indonesian politician, notary, and educator. He served as Indonesia's second Minister of Justice between November 1945 and June 1946, and as Minister of Education from October 1946 to July 1947, along with being a member of the Central Indonesian National Committee. Prior to Indonesian independence, he was a member of the Investigating Committee for Preparatory Work for Independence (BPUPK).

Soewandi originated from an aristocratic family and worked in the Dutch East Indies' education department during the colonial period. As minister under Sutan Sjahrir, he was credited with the Republican Spelling System for the Indonesian language in 1947, along with taking part in diplomatic negotiations with the Dutch. He worked as a notary after his ministerial terms.

== Early life and education ==
Soewandi was born on 31 October 1898 in Ngawi Regency, modern-day East Java, to an aristocratic family. He graduated from a colonial native elementary school (Hollandsch-Inlandsche School) in 1911, and then enrolled at a native civil servant school (Opleiding School Voor Inlandsche Ambtenaren/OSVIA) where he graduated from in 1917. While he began to work after graduating from OSVIA, he continued to study to become an administrator, and later obtained a Master's in Law degree from the Rechtshoogeschool te Batavia (Batavia Law School, today part of the University of Indonesia) in 1938.

== Career ==
=== Colonial period ===
Soewandi worked in the colonial government of the Dutch East Indies, mostly in its Department of Education and Culture where he worked from his OSVIA graduation until the proclamation of Indonesian independence. As part of his work, he briefly toured the Netherlands and the United Kingdom in 1938–1939 to study literature and theatre in the two countries. He was promoted to administrator and later secretary after his return from abroad. Throughout the Dutch colonial period, Soewandi was also active in native political organizations such as Budi Utomo, where he was a committee member, and the political party Parindra.

Following the Japanese takeover he continued to work in the department, though he was promoted further in 1943. He was a member of the Investigating Committee for Preparatory Work for Independence (BPUPK).

=== Minister ===
During the Indonesian National Revolution, Soewandi joined the Central Indonesian National Committee (KNIP), and later was appointed to its fifteen-member working body. Soewandi was a personal friend of revolutionary leader Sutan Sjahrir, and he was appointed Minister of Justice in the First Sjahrir Cabinet on 14 November 1945. Soewandi retained his office in the Second Sjahrir Cabinet. However, he resigned from his office on 22 June 1946. During this period, Soewandi headed the Indonesian negotiating delegation to the Netherlands in the Hoge Veluwe conference of April 1946. In an conversation with American intelligence officials in Indonesia in December 1945, Soewandi acknowledged Dutch "capital interests", but refused to acknowledge other rights.

Soewandi rejoined the government as minister in the Third Sjahrir Cabinet, where he was appointed Minister of Teaching on 2 October 1946. In this office, Soewandi formed a 52-member committee to establish new standards and curricula for Indonesian education, and formed another five-member committee led by Sutan Takdir Alisjahbana to further reform the Indonesian language. The five-member committee's work would eventually become the Republican Spelling System, which is also known as the Suwandi Spelling System (Ejaan Suwandi). The spelling was made official on 19 March 1947, and would be used as the official spelling system until replaced by the Perfected Spelling System (Ejaan Yang Disempurnakan) in 1972. Soewandi held his ministerial office until 3 July 1947 when the cabinet was dissolved.

=== Later career ===
After the end of the revolution, Soewandi worked as a notary of some renown. Notable companies founded with Soewandi as notary include Pengangkutan Penumpang Djakarta and Bank Niaga. He died on 6 March 1964 in Jakarta, and was buried at the Menteng Pulo Public Cemetery.

He was posthumously awarded the Star of Mahaputera, 3rd class in 1992.
