= Sunarjo Kolopaking =

Indonesian lawyer and sociologist (1906–1972)

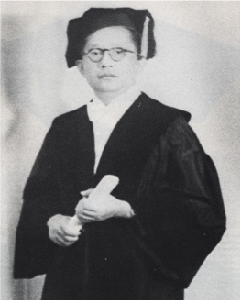

3rd Minister of Finance
- In office 14 November 1945 – 5 December 1945
- Preceded by: A. A. Maramis
- Succeeded by: Surachman Tjokroadisurjo

Personal details
- Born: 15 October 1906 Banjarnegara, Dutch East Indies
- Died: 31 March 1972 (aged 65)

Sunarjo Kolopaking (15 October 1906 – 31 March 1972), sometimes spelled as Sunario Kolopaking, was an Indonesian lawyer and sociologist. He was appointed as Minister of Finance in 1945, though rejecting the post, and he later became one of the first Indonesian professors at the University of Indonesia.

== Early life and education ==
Kolopaking was born in Banjarnegara Regency on 15 October 1906. His father, R.A.A. Djojonagaro II, was the local bupati (regent) and his mother was a noblewoman associated with the Mangkunegaran. After graduating from a HIS, he pursued further education in a MULO in Purwokerto and a AMS in Bandung. He continued his studies in law, first in Batavia before going to Leiden University and graduating from there in 1931.

== Career ==
After returning to Indonesia, he worked at a bank between 1934 and 1940 while also teaching law part-time. During the Japanese occupation period, he worked under the Mangkunegaran. Near the end of the war, he was assigned to Jakarta to head an economic office.

He was appointed as the Minister of Finance in the First Sjahrir Cabinet on 14 November 1945. However, he refused the appointment, and he was hence replaced on 5 December 1945 with Surachman Tjokroadisurjo. He had also been a member of the Central Indonesian National Committee, while not being part of any political parties. He was appointed as a member of the 15-man Working Committee within the body.

He was mostly active in academia and education, being appointed as chairman of the "Indonesian Congress of Education" upon its founding in 1947, and cofounding the Institute of Indonesian Culture in 1948. He also took part in the founding of the Indonesian Police Academy in 1946, for a time serving as its chairman.

He became a professor of sociology at the University of Indonesia by 1949, becoming one of its first Indonesian professors. In 1950, when the faculty of economics was established there, Sunarjo was appointed as its first dean, due to a shortage of economists. This was until his replacement by Sumitro Djojohadikusumo in 1951. At the request of Mohammad Roem, he also helped found the Political Science Academy (Akademi Ilmu Politik) in Yogyakarta (today part of Gadjah Mada University). Kolopaking died on the evening of 31 March 1972 and his body was interred at the Menteng Pulo Public Cemetery the next day.
