= Presidential Cabinet (Indonesia) =

Cabinet of Indonesia (1945)

Presidential Cabinet Kabinet Presidensial
- Cabinet of Indonesia
- 2 September 1945 – 14 November 1945
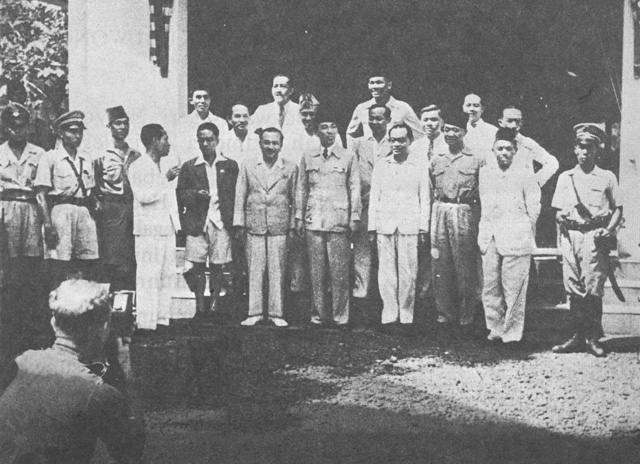
- Members of the cabinet with President Sukarno
- Date formed: 2 September 1945
- Date dissolved: 14 November 1945

People and organisations
- President: Sukarno

History
- Successor: Sjahrir I

The Presidential Cabinet (Indonesian: Kabinet Presidensial) was the first cabinet of Indonesia which was in office from September to November 1945.

== Background ==
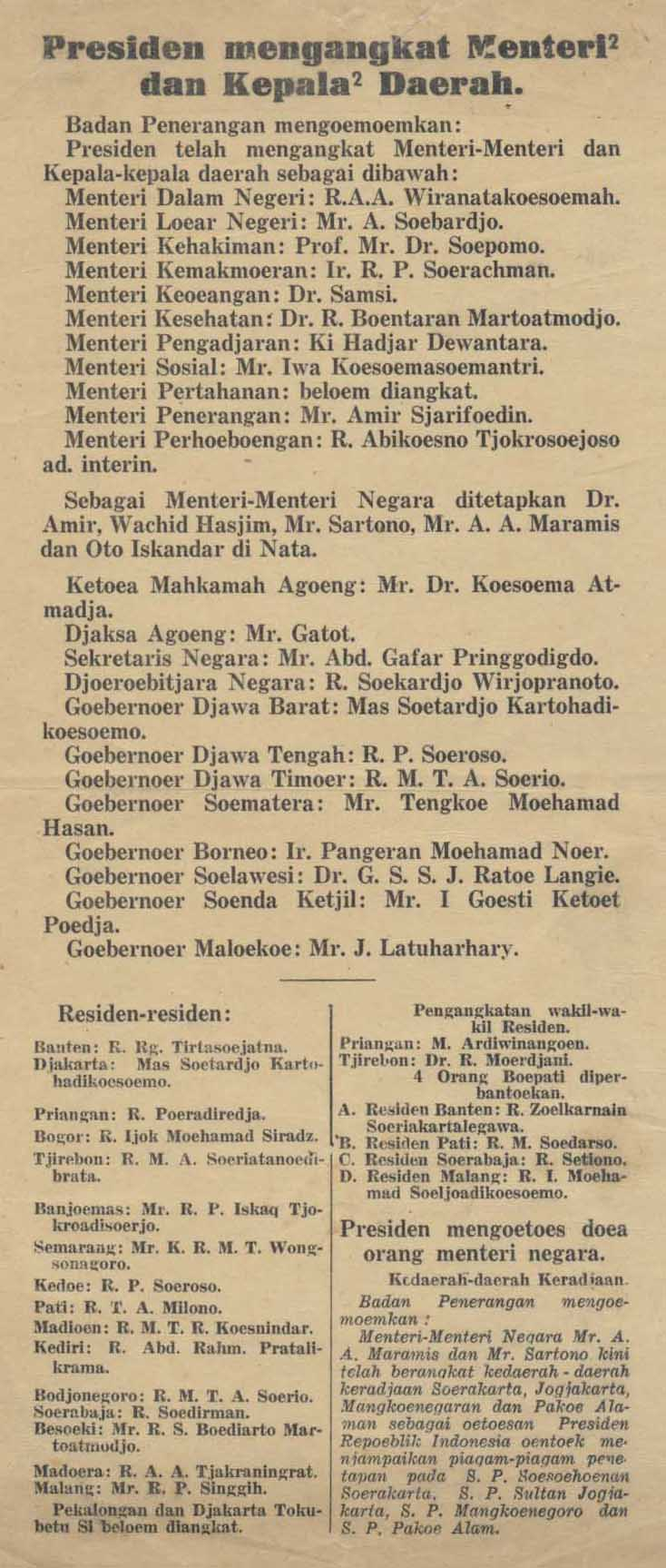
Pamphlet announcing Sukarno's Presidential Cabinet and Indonesia's provincial governors.

Indonesian had been under Japanese occupation since 1942, but by 1943, realizing they were losing the war, the Japanese appointed Indonesian advisors (Japanese: 参与, romanized: san'yo) to the administration and appointed nationalist leader Sukarno leader of a new Central Advisory Board (Chuo Sani-kai Japanese: 中央参議会) in Jakarta. On 7 August, the day after the atomic bombing of Hiroshima, the Preparatory Committee for Indonesian Independence (Indonesian: Panitia Persiapan Kemerdekaan Indonesia) or PPKI was established. Sukarno was chairman, and Hatta vice-chairman. On 19 August 1945, this body created 12 ministries for Indonesia's first cabinet. The cabinet as formed contained sanyo as well as officials who had not worked with the Japanese. The cabinet was responsible to President Sukarno.

== Composition ==
=== Executive Branch of the Cabinet ===
President	Vice President
Sukarno	Mohammad Hatta

=== Ministers of the Cabinet ===
Portfolio	Minister	Took office	Left office	Party
Minister of Home Affairs	R. A. A. Muharam Wiranatakusumah	19 August 1945	14 November 1945	Independent
Minister of Foreign Affairs	Achmad Subardjo	19 August 1945	14 November 1945	Independent
Minister of People's Security	Soeprijadi	6 October 1945	20 October 1945	Independent
Minister of People's Security	Sulyoadikusumo	20 October 1945	14 November 1945	Independent
Minister of Justice	Prof. Soepomo	19 August 1945	14 November 1945	Independent
Minister of Finance	Samsi Sastrawidagda	19 August 1945	22 September 1945	Independent
Minister of Finance	A. A. Maramis	22 September 1945	14 November 1945	Independent
Minister of Education	Ki Hadjar Dewantara	19 August 1945	14 November 1945	Independent
Minister of Health	Boentaran Martoatmodjo	19 August 1945	14 November 1945	Independent
Minister of Social Affairs	Iwa Kusumasumantri	19 August 1945	14 November 1945	Independent
Minister of Information	Amir Sjarifuddin	19 August 1945	14 November 1945	Independent
Minister of Transportation	Abikusno Tjokrosujoso	19 August 1945	14 November 1945	Independent
Minister of Welfare	R. P. Soerachman	19 August 1945	14 November 1945	Independent
Minister of Public Works	Abikusno Tjokrosujuso	19 August 1945	14 November 1945	Independent
Deputy Minister of Home Affairs	Harmani	19 August 1945	14 November 1945	Independent
Deputy Minister of Information	Ali Sastroamidjojo	19 August 1945	14 November 1945	Independent
State Minister	Mohammad Amir	19 August 1945	14 November 1945	Independent
State Minister	Wahid Hasyim	19 August 1945	14 November 1945	Independent
State Minister	Sartono	19 August 1945	14 November 1945	Independent
State Minister	A. A. Maramis	19 August 1945	14 November 1945	Independent
State Minister	Mohammad Amir	19 August 1945	14 November 1945	Independent
State Minister	Oto Iskandar di Nata	19 August 1945	14 November 1945	Independent

=== Officials holding ministerial status ===
- Chief Justice of the Supreme Court: Dr. Kusumah Atmaja
- Attorney General: Gatot Tarunamihardja
- State Secretary: Abdoel Affar Pringgodigdo
- State Spokesman: Soekarjo Wirjopranoto

== Changes ==
On 22 September 1945, Finance Minister Samsi was replaced by A. A. Maramis on health grounds. In a government decree on 6 October, Soeprijadi, a hero of the Blitar rebellion against the occupying Japanese, was officially appointed Defense Minister. However, as no news was ever heard of him, on 20 October Muhammad Soeljoadikusuma was appointed ad interim Defense Minister. Attorney General Gatot Tarunamihardja resigned on 24 October. As a temporary measure, Chief Justice Kusumah Atmaja was appointed acting Attorney General. Kasman Singodiedjo was appointed to the post on 7 November.

== The end of the cabinet ==
On 11 November 1945, the Central Indonesian National Committee, which was the de facto legislature, demanded the cabinet be responsible to it, not to President Sukarno. Sukarno agreed to this and dismissed the cabinet.
