= Darmawan Mangunkusumo =

Indonesian economist, engineer, and politician

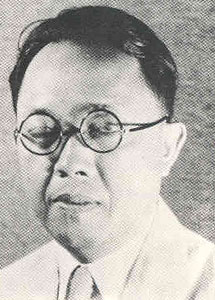

2nd Minister of Welfare
- In office 14 November 1945 – 2 October 1946 (Note: As Minister of Trade and Industry between 12 March and 26 June 1946, when it was reverted to the Ministry of Welfare.)
- Prime Minister: Sutan Sjahrir
- Preceded by: Surachman Tjokroadisurjo
- Succeeded by: Adnan Kapau Gani

Personal details
- Born: 25 May 1901 Purwodadi, Dutch East Indies
- Died: 2 August 1971 (aged 70)

Darmawan Mangunkusumo (25 May 1901 – 2 August 1971) was an Indonesian economist and engineer who served as the minister of welfare between 1945 and 1946, within the First and Second Sjahrir Cabinets. Before his ministerial tenure, he worked as a government economic official in the Dutch and Japanese colonial governments, and was part of the Indonesian nationalist movement since his studies in the Netherlands through Perhimpoenan Indonesia.

== Early life and education ==
Darmawan was born in Purwodadi, Grobogan on 25 May 1901, a younger brother of Tjipto Mangoenkoesoemo. After studying at an Europeesche Lagere School and then a Hogere Burgerschool, he enrolled at the Delft Technical College. He was the third child of his family to study in the Netherlands. At Delft, he studied chemical engineering, and became active in Perhimpoenan Indonesia (PI) where he edited the association's magazine Hindia Poetra between 1921 and 1922 when the magazine was taken over by the Minerva student magazine. By 1923, he was one of the leaders of PI alongside Mohammad Hatta, Iwa Kusumasumantri, Sartono, and Sastromoeljono, and Hindia Poetra was revived, with a clearer nationalistic tone in its articles. He graduated in 1924.

== Career ==
Darmawan returned to Indonesia in February 1925, and became chairman of the Algemeene Studieclub in Bandung by 1926. He worked in the colonial economic affairs department, despite concerns by some Dutch colonial officials of his political activities. Governor-General Andries Cornelis Dirk de Graeff received advice against employing Darmawan, which was rejected. In the late 1930s, with support from the colonial government, Darmawan launched an economic foundation in Surabaya which aimed to promote the development of light industry such as brickmaking and leatherworking.

During the Japanese occupation of the Dutch East Indies, Darmawan's foundation was given permission to continue functioning due to its output of industrial supplies. He also continued to work at the Japanese occupation government's economic affairs department. He engaged with Sutan Sjahrir's underground movement in Surabaya, where he led discussion groups which mostly consisted of students from secondary schools. He was jailed several times by the Kempeitai during the occupation.

After the proclamation of Indonesian independence, Darmawan was appointed as Minister of Welfare in the First Sjahrir Cabinet on 14 November 1945. He retained a cabinet post at the Second Sjahrir Cabinet, initially as Minister of Trade and Industry. In late June 1946, he was briefly kidnapped along with Sjahrir and Sumitro Djojohadikusumo by disgruntled army units, though they were released shortly thereafter. Despite his affiliation with the Republican government, he was appointed in March 1948 to join the board of trustees the Dutch-controlled De Javasche Bank. After the revolution, he would return to the bank as a director.

In 1959, he co-founded LIA, an English language training foundation. He died on 2 August 1971.

== General bibliography ==
- Anderson, Benedict Richard O'Gorman (2006). Java in a Time of Revolution: Occupation and Resistance, 1944–1946. Equinox Publishing. ISBN 978-979-3780-14-6.
- Ingleson, John (1975). Perhimpunan Indonesia and the Indonesian Nationalist Movement, 1923–1928. Centre of Southeast Asian Studies, Monash University. ISBN 978-0-909835-20-0.
- Legge, J. D. (2010). Intellectuals and Nationalism in Indonesia: A Study of the Following Recruited by Sutan Sjahrir in Occupied Jakarta. Equinox Publishing. ISBN 978-602-8397-23-0.
- Lindblad, J. Thomas (2008). Bridges to New Business: The Economic Decolonization of Indonesia. National University of Singapore Press. ISBN 978-9971-69-477-7.
- Poeze, Harry A.; Dijk, Cornelis; van der Meulen, Inge (2008). Di negeri penjajah: orang Indonesia di negeri Belanda, 1600–1950 (in Indonesian). Kepustakaan Populer Gramedia. ISBN 978-979-9101-23-5.
