= Second Sjahrir Cabinet =

Third cabinet of Indonesian government

Second Sjahrir Cabinet Kabinet Sjahrir II
- 3rd Cabinet of Indonesia
- 1946
- Date formed: 12 March 1946
- Date dissolved: 2 October 1946

People and organisations
- Head of state: Sukarno
- Head of government: Sutan Sjahrir
- No. of ministers: 24 ministers
- Member party: PSI; Parkindo; Masyumi; PNI; PKI; Independent

History
- Predecessor: Sjahrir I Cabinet
- Successor: Sjahrir III Cabinet

The Second Sjahrir Cabinet (Indonesian: Kabinet Sjahrir II) was the third Indonesian cabinet and the second formed by Sutan Sjahrir. It served from March to October 1946.

== Background ==
The first Sjahrir cabinet had been forced to resign by Tan Malaka and his opposition Struggle Front. President Sukarno then offered this group the chance to form a new government, but it was unable to do so principally because of fears from other members of the group that Tan Malaka would try to replace Sukarno. Sukarno, with the support of the Central Indonesian National Committee (KNIP), then asked Sjahrir to form a new cabinet. The KNIP asked Sjahrir to form a cabinet including a wider range of opinion. Sjahrir agreed on the condition he would have the greater say in the choice of members.

== Composition ==
Ten of the members of the previous cabinet served in the new cabinet. It contained members from a range of political parties, but Sjahrir's group was still dominant.

Portfolio	Minister	Took office	Left office	Party
Prime Minister; Minister of Foreign Affairs; Minister of Defense	Sutan Sjahrir	12 March 1946	2 October 1946	PSI
Minister of Home Affairs	Sudarsono Mangunadikusumo	12 March 1946	2 October 1946	PSI
Minister of Justice	Soewandi	12 March 1946	22 June 1946	Independent
Minister of Finance	Soerachman Tjokroadisuryo	12 March 1946	2 October 1946	Independent
Minister of Agriculture and Supplies	Rasad	12 March 1946	26 June 1946	Independent
Minister of Trade and Industry	Darmawan Mangunkusumo	12 March 1946	26 June 1946	Independent
Minister of Welfare	Darmawan Mangunkusumo	26 June 1946	2 October 1946	Independent
Minister of Public Works	Martinus Putuhena	12 March 1946	2 October 1946	Parkindo
Minister of Transportation	Endun Abdul Karim	12 March 1946	2 October 1946	Independent
Minister of Information	Mohammad Natsir	12 March 1946	2 October 1946	Masyumi
Minister of Social Affairs	Maria Ulfa Santoso (Perwari/PPI)	12 March 1946	2 October 1946	Independent
Minister of Health	Dr. Darma Setiawan	12 March 1946	2 October 1946	Independent
Minister of Education	Muhammad Sjafei (Note: Did not take office.)	12 March 1946	2 October 1946	Independent
Minister of Religious Affairs	Mohammad Rasjidi	12 March 1946	2 October 1946	Masyumi
State Minister	Wikana	12 March 1946	2 October 1946	Independent
Junior Minister of Foreign Affairs	Agus Salim	12 March 1946	2 October 1946	Independent
Junior Minister of Defense	Arudji Kartawinata	12 March 1946	2 October 1946	Masyumi
Junior Minister of Justice	Hadi	12 March 1946	2 October 1946	Independent
Junior Minister of Finance	Sjafruddin Prawiranegara	12 March 1946	2 October 1946	Masyumi
Junior Minister of Agriculture and Supplies	Saksono	12 March 1946	2 October 1946	PSI
Junior Minister of Communications	Djuanda	12 March 1946	2 October 1946	Independent
Junior Minister of Public Works	Herling Laoh	12 March 1946	2 October 1946	PNI
Junior Minister of Social Affairs	Abdul Madjid Djojoadiningrat	12 March 1946	2 October 1946	PSI
Junior Minister of Health	Dr. Johannes Leimena	12 March 1946	2 October 1946	Parkindo
Junior Minister of Education	Todung Sutan Gunung Mulia	12 March 1946	2 October 1946	Parkindo

== Changes ==
Minister of Justice Soewandi resigned on 22 June 1946 and four days later Minister of Agriculture and Supplies Rasad lost his job when the ministry he headed was merged into the Ministry of Trade and Industry, which later became the Ministry of Welfare. Darmawan Mangoenkoesoemo was appointed Minister of Welfare and Saksono as Junior Minister of Welfare.

== The end of the cabinet ==
The second Sjahrir cabinet fell because of the kidnapping of Sjahrir and Darmawan Mangoenkoesoemo on 27 June 1946 by soldiers commanded by General Sudarsono. Like other opposition forces, they believed the government had betrayed the ideal of total independence by negotiating with the Dutch and conceding de facto Dutch control over parts of Indonesia. The rest of the cabinet held a meeting chaired by Amir Sjarifuddin and proposed transferring all powers to Sukarno. The president took control of the government by a decree issued on 28 June. This decree returned Indonesia to a presidential system and dissolved the cabinet.
