= First Sjahrir Cabinet =

Second cabinet of Indonesian government

First Sjahrir Cabinet Kabinet Sjahrir I
- 2nd Cabinet of Indonesia
- 1945–1946
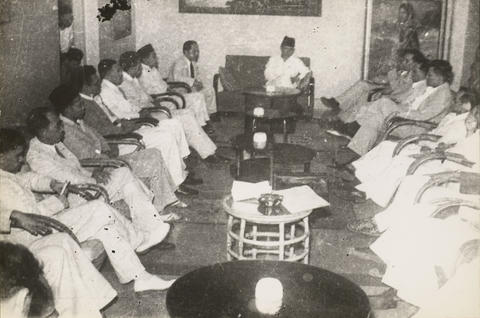
- The formation of the prime minister's cabinet under the leadership of Sutan Syahrir which was led by president Sukarno
- Date formed: 14 November 1945
- Date dissolved: 12 March 1946

People and organisations
- Head of state: Sukarno
- Head of government: Sutan Sjahrir
- No. of ministers: 16 ministers
- Member party: PSI; Parkindo; Masyumi; Independent
- Opposition party: Unity Struggle: PNI; Masyumi
- Opposition leader: Tan Malaka (Unity Struggle)

History
- Predecessor: Presidential Cabinet
- Successor: Sjahrir II Cabinet

The First Sjahrir Cabinet (Indonesian: Kabinet Sjahrir I) was the second Indonesian cabinet, named after the prime minister. It served from November 1945 to March 1946.

== Background ==
The first Sjahrir cabinet was established following the 11 November 1945 demand from the Central Indonesian National Committee, which was the de facto legislature, that the cabinet be responsible to it, not to President Sukarno. The existing cabinet was dismissed and Sutan Sjahrir was asked to become prime minister. He agreed to do so on the condition he was allowed to select his own cabinet. The cabinet lineup was announced on 14 November 1945.

== Composition ==
None of the ministers had served in the previous cabinet. The government was intended to be inclusive, with representation from the nationalist and the religious parties, the latter grouping being represented by the PSII.

Portfolio	Minister	Took office	Left office	Party
Prime Minister; Minister of Home Affairs; Minister of Foreign Affairs	Sutan Sjahrir	14 November 1945	12 March 1946	PSI
Minister of People's Security	Amir Sjarifuddin	14 November 1945	12 March 1946	PSI
Minister of Defense	Amir Sjarifuddin	3 January 1946	12 March 1946	PSI
Minister of Information	Amir Sjarifuddin	14 November 1945	3 January 1946	PSI
Minister of Information	Mohammad Natsir	3 January 1946	12 March 1946	Masyumi
Minister of Finance	Soenarjo Kolopaking	14 November 1945	5 December 1945	Independent
Minister of Finance	Soerachman Tjokroadisoerjo	5 December 1945	12 March 1946	Independent
Minister of Education	Todung Sutan Gunung Mulia	14 November 1945	12 March 1946	Parkindo
Minister of Justice	Soewandi	14 November 1945	12 March 1946	Independent
Minister of Social Affairs	Adjidarmo Tjokronegoro	14 November 1945	5 December 1945	PSI
Minister of Social Affairs	Sudarsono Mangunadikusumo	5 December 1945	12 March 1946	PSI
Minister of Health	Dr. Darma Setiawan	14 November 1945	12 March 1946	Independent
Minister of Welfare	Darmawan Mangunkusumo	14 November 1945	12 March 1946	PSI
Minister of Public Works	Martinus Putuhena	14 November 1945	12 March 1946	Parkindo
Minister of Transportation	Endun Abdul Karim	14 November 1945	12 March 1946	Independent
Minister of Religious Affairs	Rasjidi	3 January 1946	12 March 1946	Masyumi
State Minister	Rasjidi	14 November 1945	3 January 1946	Masyumi
Junior Minister of Home Affairs	Harmani	14 November 1945	12 March 1946	Independent
Junior Minister of People's Security	Abdul Murad	14 November 1945	12 March 1946	PSI
Junior Minister of Defense	Soegiono Josodiningrat	3 January 1946	12 March 1946	Independent

== Changes ==
There were several changes over the short life of this cabinet. On 5 December 1945, Finance Minister Soenarjo Kolopaking and Social Affairs Minister Adjidarmo Tjokronegoro resigned and were replaced by Soerachman Tjokroadisoerjo and Soedarsono respectively. On 3 January 1946, State Minister Rasjidi was appointed Minister of Religious Affairs, heading the new ministry established the same day. The following day, Muhammad Natsir took over Amir Sjarifuddin's job as Minister of Information. On 7 January 1946, Soegiono Josodiningrat was appointed to replace Junior Minister of People's Security Abdul Murad and the name of the ministry was changed to the Ministry of Defense.

== The end of the cabinet ==
The Sjahrir cabinet fell as a result of the conflict between the Struggle Front of opposition politician Tan Malaka and Sjahrir over the latter's readiness to compromise with the Dutch before their colonial army had left Indonesia. Tan Malaka demanded a cabinet of national unity which secured widespread public support, prompting Sjahrir's resignation on 28 February 1946.
