= Darma Setiawan =

Indonesian doctor (1911 - 1953)

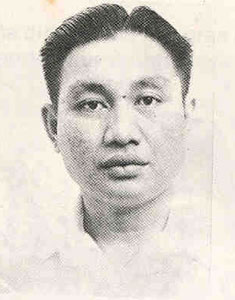

4rd Secretary General of the Ministry of Foreign Affairs
- In office 8 May 1951 – 7 March 1953
- Preceded by: Mohammad Ichsan
- Succeeded by: Sutan Mohammad Rasjid (acting); Ruslan Abdulgani

2nd Minister of Health of Indonesia
- In office 14 November 1945 – 27 June 1947
- President: Sukarno
- Prime Minister: Sutan Sjahrir
- Preceded by: Boentaran Martoatmodjo
- Succeeded by: Johannes Leimena

Personal details
- Born: September 3, 1911 Batavia, Dutch East Indies
- Died: March 7, 1953 (aged 41) Jakarta, Indonesia

Military service
- Allegiance: Dutch East Indies
- Branch/service: Royal Netherlands East Indies Army
- Years of service: 1938-1942
- Rank: Lieutenant

Raden Darma Setiawan Notohatmodjo (3 September 1911 – 7 March 1953) was an Indonesian doctor, politician, and diplomat who served as the Minister of Health from 1945 to 1947 during the Sutan Sjahrir government.

== Early life and education ==
Darma was born on 3 September 1911 and had mixed blood of Javanese and Bengkulu. He studied at Algemene middelbare school (AMS) and later pursued his higher education at Geneeskundig Hoogeschool (medical college), graduating in 1938. During college year, he joined the Union of Indonesia Students and served as general commissioner for the 1938–1939 period.

== Career ==
=== KNIL ===
Upon graduating from medical school, Darma joined KNIL in 1938 and became its health officer. He earned lieutenant rank and was assigned to Jakarta, Bandung, Padang, and Muara Siberut.

=== Japanese occupation ===
After Japan defeated the Dutch, he was briefly detained in Bandung. Later, he worked at a Japanese military hospital in Jakarta. During his work at the military hospital in Jakarta, he brawled with Japanese soldiers, causing him to get arrested in Madura. He was soon freed and moved to Semarang to work at a military hospital. However, he refused to pledge loyalty to Japan and the occupation government arrested him. The Japanese occupation government gave a death sentence to Darma. Nevertheless, the death sentence was annulled and he was released through Sukarno intervention. Soon after, he worked for Dr. Soeharto Sastrosoeyoso.

While working as a doctor, Darma also followed the Pacific War development by receiving the news from his friend who joined the anti-fascist underground movement. He believed that Japan would not win the war.

=== Political career ===
In November 1945, Sjahrir appointed Darma as the Minister of Health and served it until 1947. He also became one of the members of the Indonesia delegation at the Linggadjati Agreement. Afterward, he served as the chairman of Jakarta Health Front in 1947 and advisor for the Indonesia delegation at Roem–Van Roijen Agreement and Dutch–Indonesian Round Table Conference in Den Haag in 1949. As a member of Indonesia delegates at the Round Table Conference, he visited London to establish contact with the British Ministry of Foreign Affairs and learn about public health services.

After the transfer of sovereignty, he worked at the Ministry of Foreign Affairs. In 1951, Darma was appointed as the Secretary General of the Ministry of Foreign Affairs, replacing Ichsan on 8 May 1951. Furthermore, he also served as an advisor and participated in the UN General Assembly in Lake Success and Paris as an Indonesian delegate.

== Death ==
Darma underwent an appendicitis operation on 28 February 1953 and told Dr. Suharto that he would take part in the next UN General Assembly after the operation. Nevertheless, he died on 7 March 1953 at Dr. Cipto Mangunkusumo Hospital, Jakarta due to the post-surgery complication. He was buried in Karet Bivak Cemetery and his funeral was attended by Mohammad Hatta, Moekarto Notowidigdo, and Ambassador of India to Indonesia, Bhagwat Dayal.

Soon after his death, Mukarto appointed Sutan Mohammad Rasjid as acting Secretary General of the Ministry of Foreign Affairs.
