= Abikusno Tjokrosujoso =

Indonesian politician

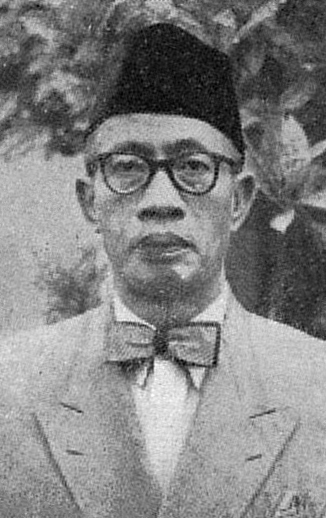
- Abikusno Tjokrosujoso

1st Minister of Transportation
- In office 19 August 1945 – 14 November 1945
- President: Sukarno
- Preceded by: None
- Succeeded by: Endun Abdul Karim
- In office 30 July 1953 – 29 September 1953
- President: Sukarno
- Preceded by: Djuanda Kartawidjaja
- Succeeded by: Roosseno Soerjohadikoesoemo

1st Minister of Public Works
- In office 19 August 1945 – 14 November 1945
- President: Sukarno
- Preceded by: None
- Succeeded by: Martinus Putuhena

Personal details
- Born: 15 June 1897 Tegalsari, Madiun, Dutch East Indies
- Died: 11 November 1968 (aged 71) Surabaya, Indonesia

Abikusno Tjokrosujoso (also spelled Abikoesno Tjokrosoejoso, or Abikusno Cokrosuyoso; 1897–1968) was one of the Founding Fathers of Indonesian Independence and a signatory to the constitution. During the Japanese occupation of the Dutch East Indies, Tjokrosoejoso was a key figure in Masjumi, and was a member of the Central Advisory Council. He later served on the "Committee of Nine" (Panitia Sembilan) that drafted the preamble (known as the Jakarta Charter) to Indonesia's 1945 constitution. After independence, he served as the Minister of Transportation in Sukarno's first Presidential Cabinet, and also became an advisor to the Bureau of Public Works.

Tjokrosujono was the younger brother of Oemar Tjokroaminoto, the first leader of Sarekat Islam. After the death of his brother on December 17, 1934, Abikusno inherited the post of leader of the Indonesian Islamic States Party (PSII). Along with Hoesni Thamrin, and Amir Sjarifoeddin, Tjokrosujoso formed the Indonesian National Political Assembly (GAPI), a united front consisting of all political parties, groups, and social organizations advocating the country's independence. The GAPI offered the Dutch colonial authorities full support in their defense against the Japanese if they were granted the right to establish a parliament under the rule of the Queen of the Netherlands. The Dutch refused the offer.
