= Ministry of Transportation (Indonesia) =

Government ministry of Indonesia

- Kementerian Perhubungan

- Headquarters of the Indonesian Ministry of Transportation

Agency overview
- Formed: 2 September 1945; 80 years ago
- Jurisdiction: Government of Indonesia
- Headquarters: Jalan Medan Merdeka Barat No. 8 Jakarta Pusat 10110 Indonesia
- Minister responsible: Dudy Purwagandhi, Minister of Transportation
- Deputy Minister responsible: Suntana, Deputy Minister of Transportation
- Website: kemenhub.go.id

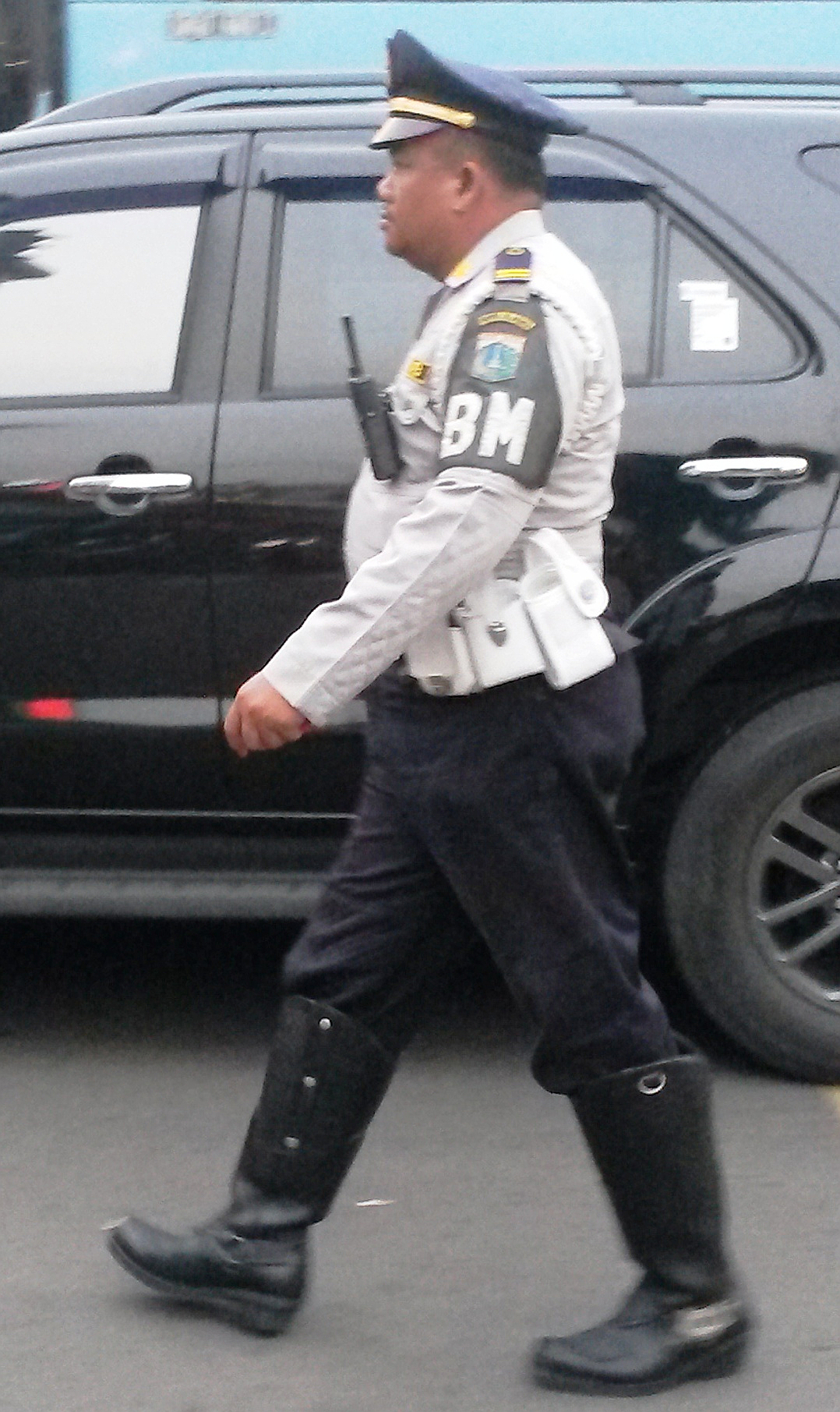
An Indonesian traffic warden, a job that falls under the Ministry of Transportation, not the police.

The Ministry of Transportation (Indonesian: Kementerian Perhubungan), formerly the Department of Transportation (Indonesian: Departemen Perhubungan) is a government ministry responsible for the governance and regulation of transportation in Indonesia. The Ministry is located in Jakarta.

== Task and function ==
The primary task of the Ministry of Transportation is to execute transportation affairs in Indonesia, its function are as follows:

1. develop, establishment and execution of transportation policy
2. asset management within ministry of transportation responsibility
3. supervision of execution of transportation policy
4. provider of technical support and supervision with regional level
5. executor of national level technical assistance

== Organizational structure ==
Based on Presidential Decree No. 23/2022 and as expanded by the Ministry of Transportation Decree No. PM 17/2022, the ministry consisted of:

- Office of the Minister of Transportation
- Office of the Deputy Minister of Transportation
- Special Advisors to the Minister
  - Special Advisor to the Minister on Energy and Transportation
  - Special Advisor to the Minister on Laws and Bureaucracy Reform in Transportation
  - Special Advisor to the Minister on Logistics and Transportation Modes
  - Special Advisor to the Minister on Regional and Environmental Affairs
  - Special Advisor to the Minister on Transportation Safety and Connectivity
- Secretariat General of Transportation
  - Bureau of Planning
  - Bureau of Human Resources and Organization
  - Bureau of Finance
  - Bureau of Legal Affairs
  - Bureau of Procurement and State Assets Management
  - Bureau of General Affairs
  - Bureau of Communication and Public Relations
- Directorate General of Land Transportation
  - Office of the Director General of Land Transportation
  - Directorate General of Land Transportation Secretariat
  - Directorate of Road Traffic
  - Directorate of Road Transport
  - Directorate of Road Transportation Infrastructures
  - Directorate of Road Transportation Facilities
  - Directorate of Riverine, Lake, and Crossing Transport
- Directorate General of Sea Transportation
  - Office of the Director General of Sea Transportation
  - Directorate General of Sea Transportation Secretariat
  - Directorate of Sea Traffic
  - Directorate of Seaport Affairs
  - Directorate of Ship and Sailor
  - Directorate of Maritime Navigation
  - Directorate of Sea and Coast Guard
- Directorate General of Civil Aviation
  - Office of the Director General of Civil Aviation
  - Directorate General of Civil Aviation Secretariat
  - Directorate of Air Transport
  - Directorate of Airport Affairs
  - Directorate of Aviation Security
  - Directorate of Air Navigation
  - Directorate of Airworthiness and Airplane Operation
- Directorate General of Rail Transportation
  - Office of the Director General of Rail Transportation
  - Directorate General of Rail Transportation Secretariat
  - Directorate of Rail Traffic and Transport
  - Directorate of Rail Infrastructure
  - Directorate of Rail Facilities
  - Directorate of Rail Safety
- Jabodetabek Transportation Management Agency
  - Office of the Head Jabodetabek Transportation Management Agency
  - Jabodetabek Transportation Management Agency Secretariat
  - Directorate of Infrastructure
  - Directorate of Traffic
  - Directorate of Transport
  - Jabodetabek Transport Servicing Stations
    - Baranangsiang Terminal, Bogor
    - Jatijajar Terminal, Depok
    - Pondok Cabe Terminal, South Tangerang
    - Poris Plawad Terminal, Tangerang
- Transportation Policies Agency
  - Center for Transportation Facilities Policies
  - Center for Transportation Infrastructures and Transportation Modes Integration Policies
  - Center for Traffics, Transport, and Urban Transportation Policies
  - Center for Transportation Safety and Security Policies
- Transportation Human Resource Development Agency
  - Center for Land Transportation Human Resource Development
    - Education and Training Center for Land Transportation, Mempawah
    - Indonesian Rail Transport Polytechnic, Madiun
    - Bali Land Transportation Polytechnic, Gianyar
    - Land Transportation Safety Polytechnic, Tegal
    - Polytechnic for Riverine, Lake, and Crossing Transport, Palembang
    - Indonesian Land Transportation Polytechnic, Bekasi
  - Center for Sea Transportation Human Resource Development
    - Institute for Sailor Refreshing Education and Capacity Upgrading, Jakarta
    - West Sumatera Sailor Polytechnic, Padang Pariaman
    - Malahayati Sailor Polytechnic, Aceh
    - Barombong Sailor Polytechnc, Makassar
    - Banten Sailor Polytechnic, Tangerang
    - North Sulawesi Sailor Polytechnic, South Minahasa
    - Sorong Sailor Polytechnic, Sorong
    - Merchant Marine Polytechnic, Semarang
    - Merchant Marine Polytechnic, Makassar
    - Merchant Marine College, Jakarta
  - Center for Air Transportation Human Resource Development
    - Indonesian Flight Academy, Banyuwangi
    - Makassar Aviation Polytechnic, Makassar
    - Surabaya Aviation Polytechnic, Surabaya
    - Medan Aviation Polytechnic, Medan
    - Indonesian Flight Polytechnic, Curug
  - Center for Transportation Apparatuses Human Resource Development
    - Education and Training Center for Character Development of Transportation Human Resources, Ciwidey
- Centers
  - Center for Data, Technology, and Information
  - Center for Sustainable Transportation Management
  - Center for Partnership and International Institutional Facilitation
  - Center for Transportation Functionaries Development
  - Center for Transportation Infrastructures Funding
- Inspectorate General of Transportation
  - Office of the Inspector General
  - Inspectorate General Secretariat
  - Inspector I
  - Inspector II
  - Inspector III
  - Inspector IV
  - Investigation Inspectorate

== List of ministers ==
1. Abikoesno Tjokrosoejoso (19 August – 14 November 1945, 30 July – 14 September 1953)
2. Abdulkarim (14 November 1945 – 2 October 1946)
3. Djuanda Kartawidjaja (2 October 1946 – 4 August 1949, 6 September 1950 – 30 July 1953)
4. Indratjahja (19 December 1948 – 13 July 1949; de facto in the Emergency Government)
5. Herling Laoh (4 August 1949 – 6 September 1950; from 20 December 1949 served for the RIS)
  Mananti Sitompul (21 January 1950 – 6 September 1950; served for the Republic of Indonesia, a state within the RIS)
6. Roosseno Soerjohadikoesomo (29 September 1953 – 23 October 1954)
  Ali Sastroamidjojo (23 October – 19 November 1954; acting)
7. Adnan Kapau Gani (19 November 1954 – 24 July 1955)
8. Frits Laoh (12 August 1955 – 3 March 1956)
9. Suchjar Tedjasukmana (24 March 1956 – 14 March 1957)
10. Sukardan (April 1957 – July 1959)
  Mohammad Nazir (April 1957 – July 1959)
11. Djatikoesoemo (July 1959 – 18 February 1960)
  Abdoelmoettalip Danoeningrat (July 1959 – 18 February 1960)
  R. Iskandar (July 1959 – 18 Februaryi 1960)
12. Djatikoesoemo (18 February 1960 – 6 March 1962)
  Abdoelmoettalip Danoeningrat (18 February 1960 – 6 March 1962)
  R. Iskandar (18 February 1960 – 6 March 1962)
13. Djatikoesoemo (6 March 1962 – 17 April 1963)
  Hidajat Martaatmadja (17 April 1963 – 13 November 1963)
  Abdoelmoettalip Danoeningrat (6 March 1962 – 13 November 1963)
  R. Iskandar (6 March 1962 – 13 November 1963)
14. Hidajat Martaatmadja (13 November 1963 – 27 August 1964)
  Ali Sadikin (13 November 1963 – 27 August 1964)
  R. Iskandar (13 November 1963 – 27 August 1964)
15. Hidajat Martaatmadja (27 August 1964 – 22 February 1966)
  Ali Sadikin (27 August 1964 – 22 February 1966)
  Partono (27 August 1964 – 22 February 1966)
16. Hidajat Martaatmadja (24 February 1966 – 28 March 1966)
  Ali Sadikin (24 February 1966 – 28 March 1966)
  Partono (24 February 1966 – 28 March 1966)
  Soerjadi Soerjadarma (24 February 1966 – 28 March 1966)
17. Jatidjan (March 1966 – July 1966)
  Utojo Utomo (March 1966 – July 1966)
  Susatyo Mardi (March 1966 – July 1966)
  S. H. Simatupang (March 1966 – July 1966)
  Partono (March 1966 – July 1966)
18. Sutopo (July 1966 – June 1968)
19. Frans Seda (June 1968 – March 1973)
20. Emil Salim (March 1973 – March 1978)
21. Roesmin Noerjadin (March 1978 – March 1988)
22. Azwar Anas (March 1988 – March 1993)
23. Haryanto Dhanutirto (March 1993 – March 1998)
24. Giri Suseno Hadihardjono (March 1998 – October 1999)
25. Agum Gumelar (29 October 1999 – 1 June 2001, 10 August 2001 – 24 May 2004)
  Soenarno (24 May – 20 October 2004; acting)
26. Budi Mulyawan Suyitno (1 June 2001 – 23 July 2001)
27. Hatta Rajasa (21 October 2004 – 9 May 2007)
28. Jusman Syafii Djamal (9 May 2007 – 20 October 2009)
29. Freddy Numberi (22 October 2009 – 19 October 2011)
30. Evert Ernest Mangindaan (19 October 2011 – 1 October 2014)
  Bambang Susantono (1–20 October 2014; acting)
31. Ignasius Jonan (27 October 2014 – 27 July 2016)
32. Budi Karya Sumadi (27 July 2016 – 20 October 2024)
33. Dudy Purwagandhi (21 October 2024 – present)

== See also ==
- Government of Indonesia
- Transport in Indonesia
- Angkasa Pura
