= Meer Uitgebreid Lager Onderwijs =

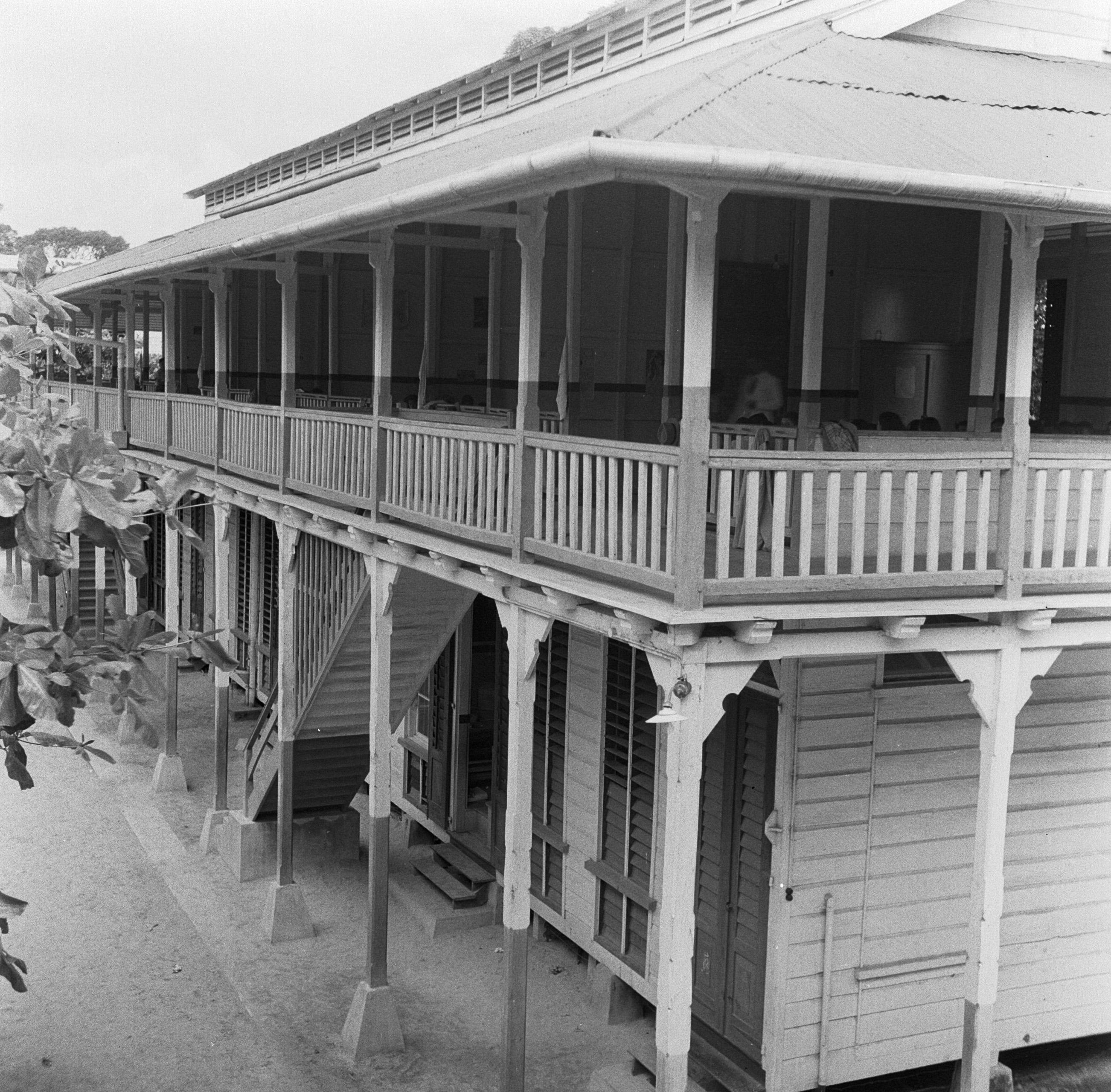
Hendrik MULO in Paramaribo (1947)

Meer Uitgebreid Lager Onderwijs (Dutch, lit. 'more advanced primary education') was a level of education in the Netherlands during part of the 20th century, Suriname and the Dutch East Indies. The system was comparable with the junior high school level in the US education system. Its successors were the mavo and vbo, now both replaced by VMBO.

In Suriname, MULO was a four year program. It was split into MULO-A which was focused on business and MULO-B which was focused on science. After graduating, students could move on to three-year VWO program leading to university or a two-year HAVO leading to higher vocational training. In 2021, it was replaced with "voortgezet onderwijs" in Suriname.

== See also ==
- Education in the Netherlands
