= Sutan Sjahrir =

Indonesian statesman and independence leader (1909–1966)

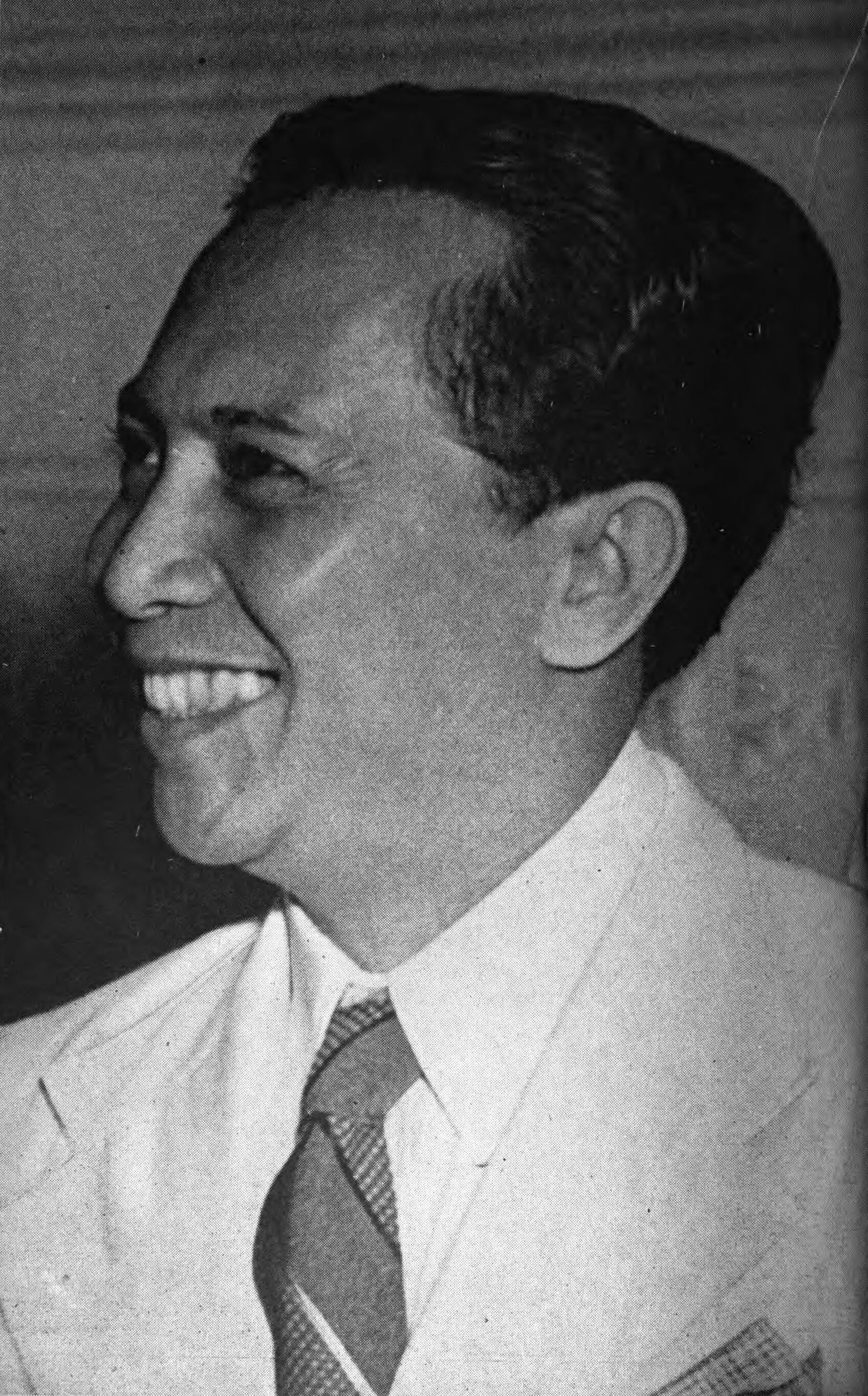
- Portrait, c. 1952

1st Prime Minister of Indonesia
- In office 14 November 1945 – 3 July 1947
- President: Sukarno
- Preceded by: Office established
- Succeeded by: Amir Sjarifuddin

2nd Minister of Foreign Affairs
- In office 14 November 1945 – 3 July 1947
- Prime Minister: Himself
- Preceded by: Achmad Soebardjo
- Succeeded by: Agus Salim

2nd Minister of Home Affairs
- In office 14 November 1945 – 12 March 1946
- Prime Minister: Himself
- Preceded by: Wiranatakusumah V
- Succeeded by: Sudarsono

Personal details
- Born: 5 March 1909 Padang Panjang, Sumatra's West Coast Residency, Dutch East Indies (present-day West Sumatra, Indonesia)
- Died: 9 April 1966 (aged 57) Zurich, Switzerland
- Resting place: Kalibata Heroes' Cemetery
- Party: Independent (1960–1966)
- Other political affiliations: New PNI (1930–1934); Paras (1945); PS (1945–1948); Socialist (1948–1960)
- Spouses: Maria Duchateau (m. 1932; div. 1948); Siti Wahyunah (m. 1951)
- Children: 2
- Relatives: Soedjatmoko (brother-in-law)
- Education: University of Amsterdam; Leiden University
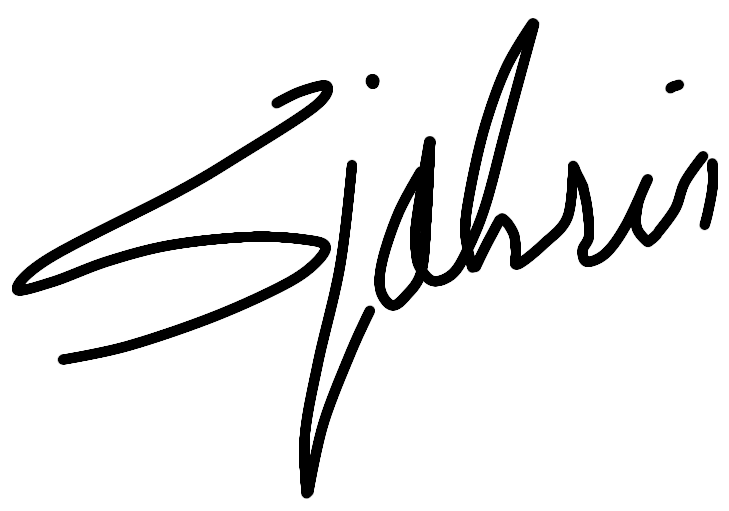
- Signature

Sutan Sjahrir (Note: Spelling based on the Republican Spelling System, which was used from 1947 until 1972. Under the old Van Ophuijsen Spelling System, his first name was spelled as Soetan. Meanwhile, under modern Indonesian orthography, his last name would be spelled as Syahrir.) (5 March 1909 – 9 April 1966) was an Indonesian statesman and independence leader who served as the first prime minister of Indonesia from 1945 until 1947. He played a key role during the Indonesian National Revolution and was active in the nationalist movement during the 1930s. Sjahrir is remembered as an idealist and intellectual.

Born to a Minangkabau family, he studied at the University of Amsterdam and later became a law student at Leiden University. He became involved in Socialist politics, and Indonesia's struggle for independence, becoming a close associate of the older independence activist Mohammad Hatta, who would later become the first Vice President of Indonesia. During the Japanese occupation of the Dutch East Indies, Sjahrir fought in the resistance. Towards independence on 17 August 1945, he was involved in the Rengasdengklok Incident and the Proclamation of Independence. Following the release of his 1945 pamphlet "Our Struggle" ("Perjuangan Kita"), he was appointed Prime Minister of Indonesia by President Sukarno. As prime minister, he was one of the few Republican leaders acceptable to the Dutch government, due to his non-cooperative stance during the Japanese occupation. He also played a crucial role in negotiating the Linggadjati Agreement.

Sjahrir founded the Indonesian Socialist Party (PSI) in 1948 to politically oppose the Indonesian Communist Party (PKI). Although small, his party was very influential in the early post-independence years. However, Sjahrir's socialist party ultimately failed to win support and was later banned in 1960, after the party was suspected of being involved in the Revolutionary Government of the Republic of Indonesia rebellion. Sjahrir himself would eventually be arrested and imprisoned without trial in 1962. In 1965, he was released to seek medical treatment and was allowed to go to Zürich, Switzerland. There, he died on 9 April 1966. On the same day, through Presidential Decree No. 76/1966, Sjahrir was inaugurated as a National Hero of Indonesia.

== Early life ==
=== Youth and family ===
Sutan Sjahrir was born on 5 March 1909, in Padang Panjang, West Sumatra. He came from an ethnic-Minangkabau family, from what is today Koto Gadang, Agam Regency. His father, Muhammad Rasyad Maharajo Sutan, served as the Hoofd or Chief public prosecutor at the Landraad in Medan. His mother, Siti Rabiah, came from Natal, in what is today South Tapanuli Regency.

Sjahrir's father had six different wives, with Sjahrir's mother being the fifth wife his father married. From his father's marriage, Sjahrir had 6 siblings. Two biological brothers, and four half-siblings. His two biological brothers were Soetan Sjahsam, who became an experienced businessman, and Soetan Noeralamsjah, who would become a prosecutor and politician from the Great Indonesia Party (Parindra). He was also the half-brother of Rohana Kudus, an advocate for women's education and a journalist with the first feminist newspaper of Sumatra.

=== Early education ===
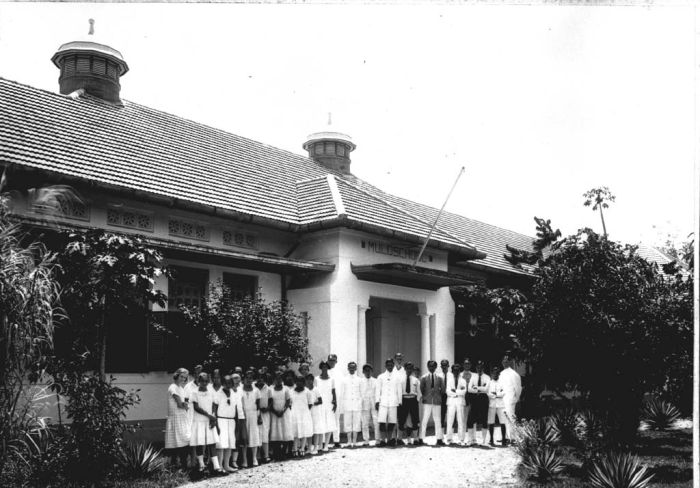
The Meer Uitgebreid Lager Onderwijs (MULO) in Medan, c. 1920's

Although from Padang Pandjang, Sjahrir's family lived in Medan, but he was often brought by his father to his grandmother's house in Koto Gadang, which has now become abandoned. Sjahrir attended the Europeesche Lagere School (ELS), before continuing to the Meer Uitgebreid Lager Onderwijs (MULO), in Medan. During his time at MULO, he was first introduced to works by authors such as Karl May. In 1926, he continued his education at the Algemene Middelbare School (AMS), in Bandung, West Java.

There, he joined the Indonesian Student Theater Association (Batovis) as a director, writer and actor. His earnings from there were used to fund the 'People's University' (Cahaya), which was a university co-founded by Sjahrir, to battle illiteracy and raise funds for the performance of patriotic plays in the Priangan countryside. Sjahrir completed his studies at the AMS in 1929, and continued his education to the Netherlands, after receiving a scholarship.

== Independence Struggle ==
=== Nationalist student activist in the Netherlands ===
Sjahrir arrived in the Netherlands in 1929, enrolling first at the University of Amsterdam and later becoming a law student at Leiden University where he gained an appreciation for socialist principles. He was a part of several labor unions as he worked to support himself. He was briefly the secretary of the Perhimpoenan Indonesia (Indonesian Association), an organization of Indonesian students in the Netherlands. Sjahrir was also one of the co-founders of Jong Indonesie, an Indonesian youth association instead of the need for association to assist in the development of Indonesian youth for further generations, only to change within a few years to Pemuda Indonesia. This, in particular, played an important role in the Youth Congress (Sumpah Pemuda), in which the association helped the Congress itself to run. During his political activities as a student in the Netherlands, he became a close associate of the older independence activist Mohammad Hatta, future vice-president of Indonesia. While he spent years in exile in the Banda Islands, he taught the local children to love their country and inspired them in many ways.

The Perhimpoenan Indonesia came under increasing communist influence, and Hatta and Sjahrir were both expelled in 1931. In reaction to the intrigue by communist cells in the PI against Hatta and himself, Sjahrir stayed calm and in character. In his memoirs their Dutch associate Sol Tas recalls: "He was not intimidated for one minute by official or quasi-official declarations, by communiques or other formulae, not afraid for one second of the maneuvers directed against him, and still less concerned for his reputation. That mixture of self-confidence and realism, that courage based on the absence of any ambition or vanity, marked the man."

=== Nationalist leader in the Dutch East Indies ===
Sjahrir had not finished his law degree, when Hatta sent Sjahrir ahead of him to the Dutch East Indies in 1931, to help set up the Indonesian National Party (PNI). Sjahrir was heavily involved in the Daulat Rajat, the newspaper of the new PNI. Within a relatively short time, he developed from a representative of Hatta into a political and intellectual leader with his standing. Both leaders were imprisoned in the Cipinang Penitentiary Institution by the Dutch in March 1934 and convicted for nationalist activities in November 1934, exiled to Boven-Digoel where they arrived in March 1935, then to Banda a year later, and just before the Indies fell to the Japanese in 1941, to Sukabumi.

=== Resistance leader during the Japanese occupation ===
During the Japanese occupation of the Dutch East Indies, he had little public role, apparently sick with tuberculosis, while he was one of the few independence leaders who was involved in the resistance movement against the Japanese occupation. Sukarno, Hatta, and Sjahrir had agreed that Sjahrir would go underground to organise the revolutionary resistance while the other two would continue their cooperation with the Japanese occupiers.

== Prime minister ==
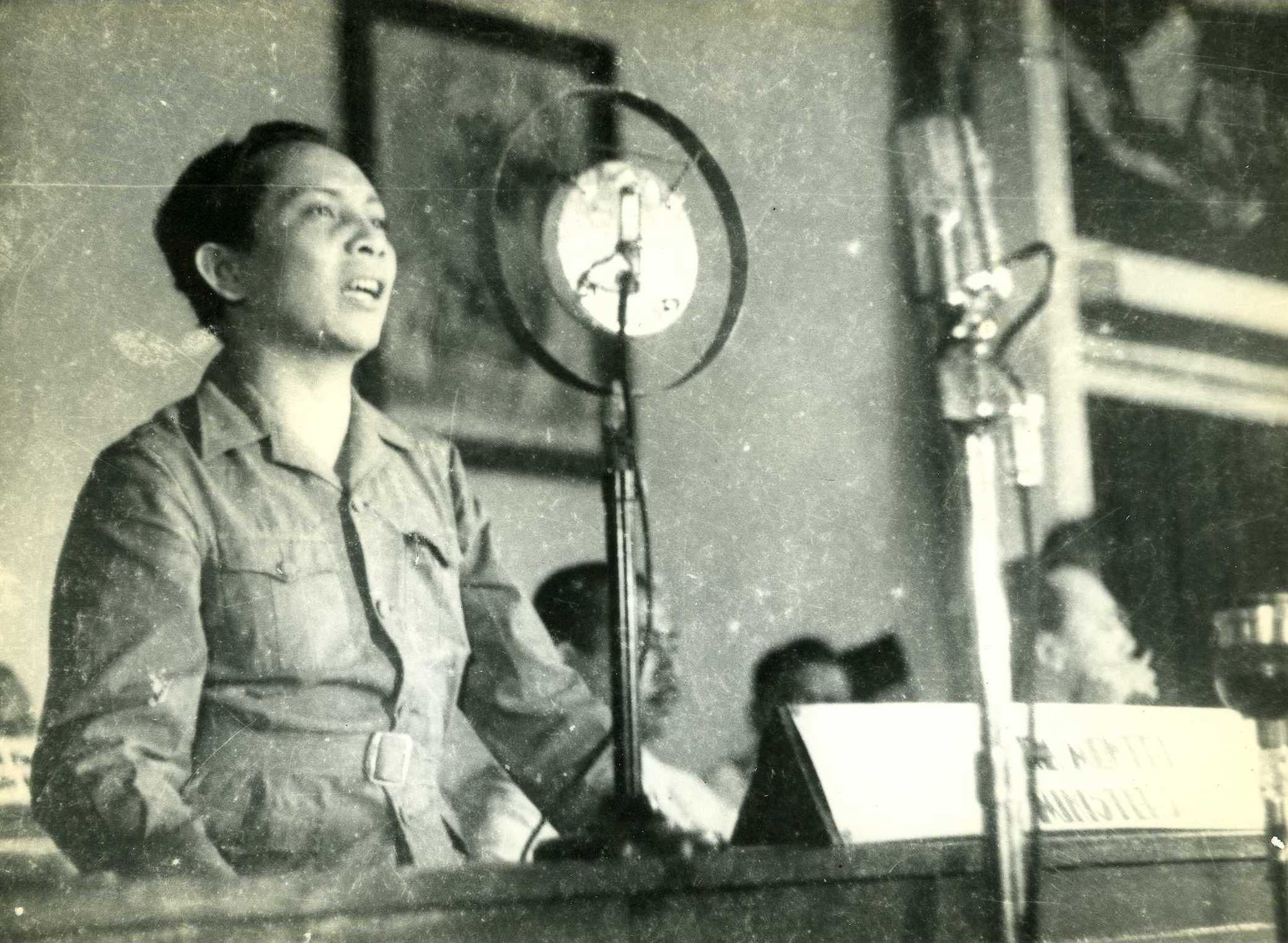
Sjahrir at KNIP plenary session, 1947 in Malang.

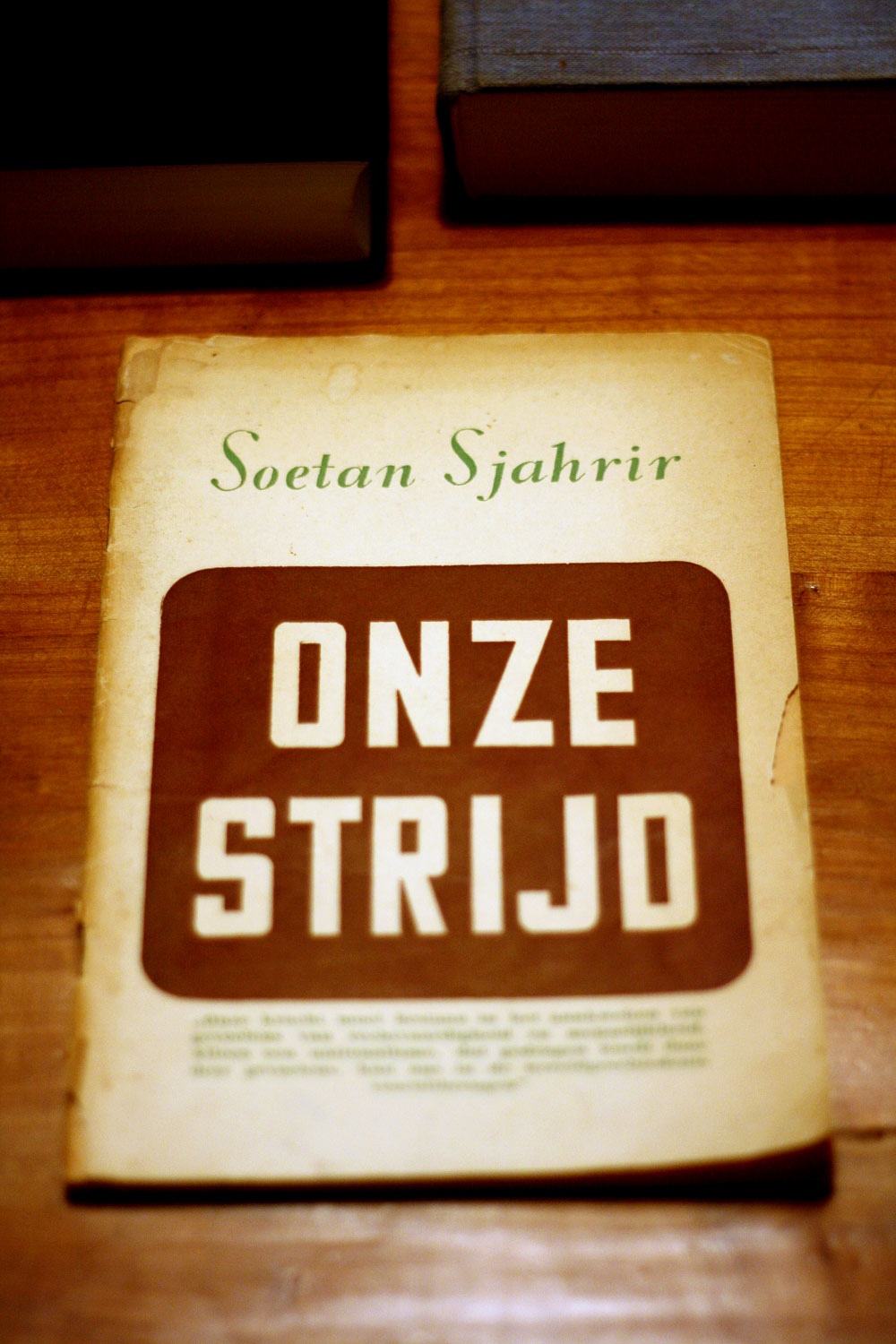
Our Struggle book cover, 1945

At the height of chaos and violence during the early Bersiap period of the Indonesian revolution, Sjahrir published an epoch-making pamphlet named 'Our Struggle'. Originally published in Dutch as 'Indonesische Overpeinzingen' ('Indonesian Musings'), it was soon thereafter translated into the Indonesian language as 'Perdjoeangan Kita' in 1945 and was then translated into the English language by Charles Wolf Jr. and named 'Out of Exile' published by John Day, New York, 1949. The English version contains a considerable amount of additional text. "Perhaps the high point of his career was the publication of his pamphlet 'Our Struggle'. Whoever reads that pamphlet today can scarcely comprehend what it demanded in insight and courage. For it appeared at a moment when the Indonesian masses, brought to the boiling point by the Japanese occupation and civil war, sought release in racist and other hysterical outbursts. Sjahrir's pamphlet went directly against this, and many must have felt his call for chivalry, for the understanding of other ethnic groups, as a personal attack." Sal Tas.

After writing his pamphlet he was appointed prime minister by President Sukarno in November 1945 and served until June 1947. Professor Wertheim describes Sjahrir's early accomplishments as prime minister as follows: "...Sjahrir knows what he wants and will not be distracted by popular sentiment or circumstantiality. He is able to overturn a ministry fabricated by the Japanese and establish a new ministry of honest, fairly capable, fairly democratic and social minded men under his leadership. No small feat in revolutionary circumstances..."

Due to his non-cooperative stance during the Japanese occupation, he was one of the few Republican leaders acceptable to the Dutch government during the early independence negotiations. In 1946, Sjahrir played a crucial role in negotiating the Linggadjati Agreement, though his thoughts were opposed by some internal political adversaries.

If we determine the value of Indonesia's freedom by its genuinely democratic quality, then in our political struggle vis-a-vis the outside world, it is for this inner content that we must strive. "The State of the Republic of Indonesia" is only a name we give to whatever content we intend and hope to provide. In 'Perdjoeangan Kita' (Our Struggle), October 1945, Sjahrir.

== Political leader ==
When Sjahrir was appointed prime minister in 1945, he was the youngest world leader at 36 years old.

I really find teaching the greatest work there is, for helping young people to shape themselves is one of the noblest tasks of society.

— Sutan Sjahrir

Sjahrir founded the Indonesian Socialist Party (PSI) in 1948 to politically oppose the Indonesian Communist Party (PKI). Sutan's socialist party ultimately failed to win support and was later banned in 1960. In the mid-1930s, Sjahrir warned about the tendency of socialists to be dragged into the notions of the extreme political left. Sjahrir described his fear of the trend of socialists to adopt ideas of communist absolutism as follows: "Those socialist activists, with all good intentions, suddenly and unnoticed become 'absolute' thinkers, 'absolutely' discarding freedom, 'absolutely' spitting on humanity and the rights of the individual. ... They envision the terminus of human development as one huge military complex of extreme order and discipline "

Although small, his party was very influential in the early post-independence years, because of the expertise and high education levels of its leaders. However, the party performed poorly in the 1955 elections, partly because the grassroots constituency at the time was unable to fully understand the concepts of social democracy Sjahrir was trying to convey. The PSI was later banned by President Sukarno in August 1960 for supporting a rebellion in Sumatra and opposing the president's policies.

== Final years ==
In 1962, Sjahrir was jailed on alleged conspiracy charges for which he was never put on trial. Instead of fighting back and creating more conflicts, he chose to step back from politics and accept the consequences. During his imprisonment he suffered from high blood pressure and in 1965 had a stroke, losing his speech. Sjahrir was sent to Zürich, Switzerland for treatment, and died there in exile in 1966.

== Legacy ==
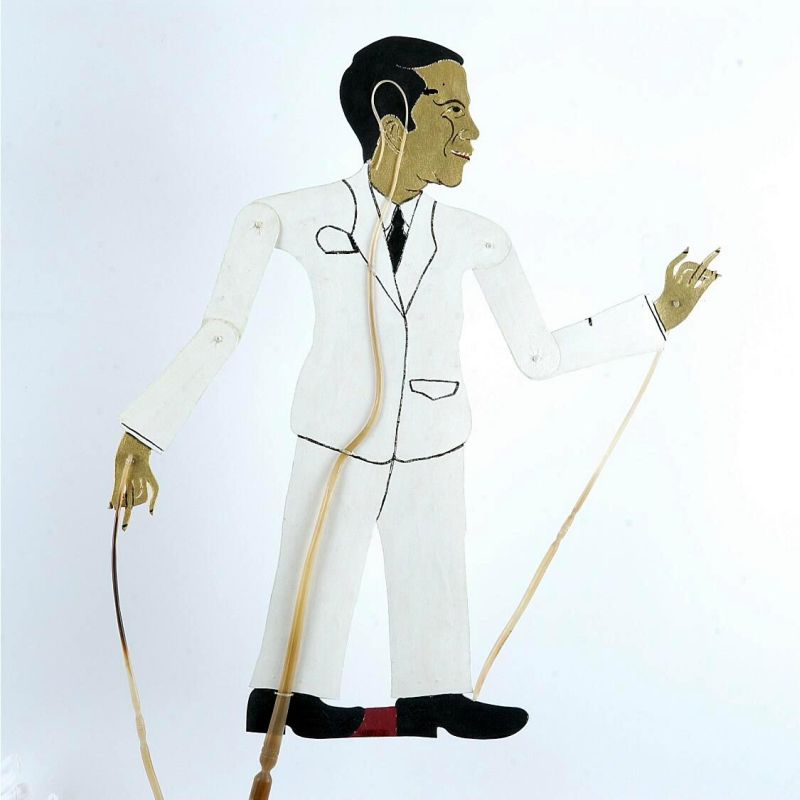
Wayang model of Sutan Sjahrir

Although a revolutionary opponent of Dutch colonialism, he remained highly respected in the Netherlands. After he died in 1966 the former Dutch Prime Minister Professor Schermerhorn commemorated Sjahrir in a public broadcast on national radio, calling him a "noble political warrior" with "high ideals" and expressing the hope that he would be recognised as such by the next generations in Indonesia.

In the 21st century Sjahrir's legacy in Indonesia is being publicly rehabilitated.

In 2009 Indonesian Foreign Minister Hassan Wirajuda said: "He was a thinker, a founding father, a humanistic leader and a statesman. He should be a model for the young generation of Indonesians. His thoughts, his ideas and his spirit are still relevant today as we face global challenges in democracy and the economy."

== See also ==
- List of prime ministers of Indonesia
- Sjahrir I Cabinet
- Sjahrir II Cabinet
- Sjahrir III Cabinet

== Notes ==
Political offices
New office Office established	Prime Minister of Indonesia; 14 November 1945 – 3 July 1947	Succeeded by Amir Sjarifuddin
