= List of female cabinet ministers of Indonesia =

Indonesian female minister

This is a list of current and former female cabinet member of Indonesia, including president and vice president. As of September 2025, Cabinet of Indonesia has had 41 female ministers.

== Ministers ==
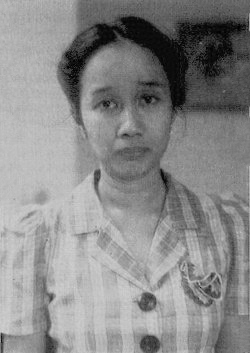
Maria Ulfah Santoso, the first female minister of Indonesia

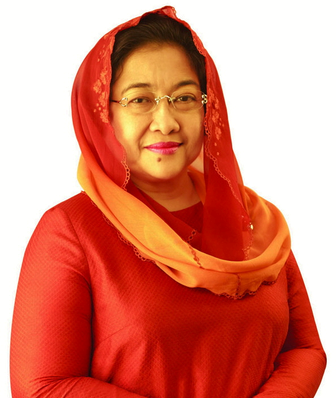
Megawati Soekarnoputri, the first female vice president and president of Indonesia

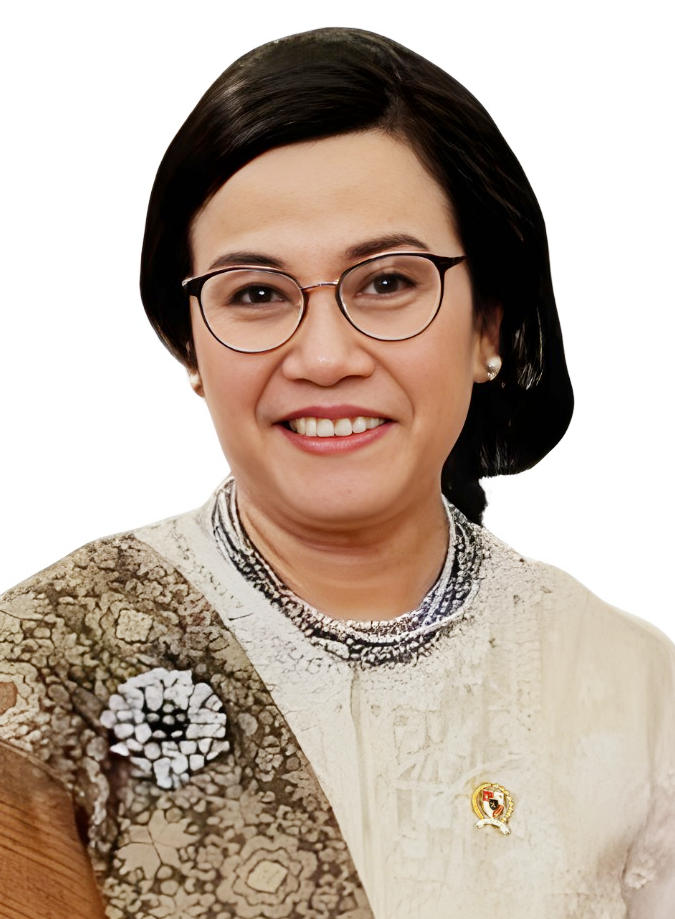
Sri Mulyani, the longest serving female minister in Indonesia

denotes the first female minister of that particular department.
Bold denotes incumbent female minister.

Minister	Position	Took office	Left office	Administration
**Government**
Megawati Sukarnoputri	Vice President of Indonesia	21 October 1999	23 July 2001	Abdurrahman Wahid
Megawati Sukarnoputri	President of Indonesia	23 July 2001	20 October 2004	Herself
**Coordinating Ministry for Human Development and Cultural Affairs**
Puan Maharani	Minister of Human Development and Cultural Affairs	27 October 2014	20 October 2019	Joko Widodo
**Minister of Basic Education and Culture**
Artati Marzuki Sudirdjo	Minister of Basic Education and Culture	27 August 1964	22 February 1966	Sukarno
**Minister of Foreign Affairs**
Retno Marsudi	Minister of Foreign Affairs	27 October 2014	20 October 2024	Joko Widodo
**Minister of Finance**
Sri Mulyani	Minister of Finance	7 December 2005	20 May 2010	Susilo Bambang Yudhoyono
Sri Mulyani	Minister of Finance	27 July 2016	8 September 2025	Joko Widodo
Sri Mulyani	Minister of Finance	27 July 2016	8 September 2025	Prabowo Subianto
**Minister of Trade**
Rini Soemarno	Minister of Trade and Industry	10 August 2001	20 October 2004	Megawati Sukarnoputri
Mari Elka Pangestu	Minister of Trade	20 October 2004	19 October 2011	Susilo Bambang Yudhoyono
**Minister of Industry**
Rini Soemarno	Minister of Trade and Industry	10 August 2001	20 October 2004	Megawati Sukarnoputri
**Minister of Manpower**
Soerastri Karma Trimurti	Minister of Labor	3 July 1947	29 January 1948	Amir Sjarifuddin
Ida Fauziyah	Minister of Manpower	23 October 2019	20 October 2024	Joko Widodo
**Minister of Social Welfare**
Maria Ulfah Santoso	Minister of Social Welfare	12 March 1946	26 June 1947	Sutan Sjahrir
Rusiah Sardjono	Minister of Social Welfare	6 March 1962	26 March 1966	Sukarno
Nani Soedarsono	Minister of Social Welfare	19 March 1983	21 March 1988	Suharto
Haryati Soebadio	Minister of Social Welfare	21 March 1988	17 March 1993	Suharto
Endang Kusuma Inten Soeweno	Minister of Social Welfare	21 March 1993	14 March 1998	Suharto
Siti Hardiyanti Rukmana	Minister of Social Welfare	14 March 1998	21 May 1998	Suharto
Justika Baharsjah	Minister of Social Welfare	21 May 1998	26 October 1999	B. J. Habibie
Khofifah Indar Parawansa	Minister of Social Affairs	27 October 2014	17 January 2018	Joko Widodo
Tri Rismaharini	Minister of Social Affairs	23 December 2020	6 September 2024	Joko Widodo
**Minister of Agriculture**
Justika Baharsjah	Minister of Agriculture	14 March 1998	21 May 1998	Suharto
**Minister of Public Works and Housing**
Erna Witoelar	Minister of Housing, Resettlement and Regional Development	26 October 1999	23 July 2001	Abdurrahman Wahid
**Minister of Maritime Affairs and Fisheries**
Susi Pudjiastuti	Minister of Maritime Affairs and Fisheries	27 October 2014	20 October 2019	Joko Widodo
**Minister of Health**
Siti Fadilah Supari	Minister of Health	21 October 2004	20 October 2009	Susilo Bambang Yudhoyono
Endang Rahayu Sedyaningsih	Minister of Health	22 October 2009	26 April 2012	Susilo Bambang Yudhoyono
Nafsiah Mboi	Minister of Health	14 June 2012	20 October 2014	Susilo Bambang Yudhoyono
Nila Moeloek	Minister of Health	27 October 2014	20 October 2019	Joko Widodo
**Minister of Tourism and Creative Economy**
Mari Elka Pangestu	Minister of Tourism and Creative Economy	19 October 2011	20 October 2014	Susilo Bambang Yudhoyono
**Minister of Environment an Forestry**
Siti Nurbaya Bakar	Minister of Environment and Forestry	27 October 2014	20 October 2024	Joko Widodo
**Minister of Woman Empowerment and Child Protection**
Lasiyah Soetanto	Minister of Women	19 March 1983	1987	Suharto
Anindyati Sulasikin Murpratomo	Minister of State for Women	1987	21 March 1993	Suharto
Mien Sugandhi	Minister of State for Women	21 March 1993	14 March 1998	Suharto
Tutty Alawiyah	Minister of State for Women's Affairs	14 March 1998	20 October 1999	Suharto
Tutty Alawiyah	Minister of State for Women's Affairs	14 March 1998	20 October 1999	B. J. Habibie
Khofifah Indar Parawansa	Minister of State for Women's Empowerment	26 October 1999	23 July 2001	Abdurrahman Wahid
Sri Redjeki Sumarjoto	Minister of State for Women's Empowerment	10 August 2001	20 October 2004	Megawati Sukarnoputri
Meutia Hatta	Minister of State for Women's Empowerment	20 October 2004	20 October 2009	Susilo Bambang Yudhoyono
Linda Amalia Sari	Minister of Women Empowerment and Child Protection	21 October 2009	20 October 2014	Susilo Bambang Yudhoyono
Yohana Yembise	Minister of Women Empowerment and Child Protection	27 October 2014	20 October 2019	Joko Widodo
I Gusti Ayu Bintang Darmawati	Minister of Women Empowerment and Child Protection	23 October 2019	20 October 2024	Joko Widodo
**Arifah Choiri Fauzi**	Minister of Women Empowerment and Child Protection	20 October 2024	Incumbent	Prabowo Subianto
**Minister of State-Owned Enterprises**
Rini Soemarno	Minister of State-Owned Enterprises	27 October 2014	20 October 2019	Joko Widodo
**Minister of National Development Planning**
Sri Mulyani	Minister of National Development Planning	20 October 2004	7 December 2005	Susilo Bambang Yudhoyono
Armida Alisjahbana	Minister of National Development Planning	21 October 2009	20 October 2014	Susilo Bambang Yudhoyono
**Minister of Communication and Digital Affairs**
**Meutya Hafid**	Minister of Communications and Digital Affairs	21 October 2024	Incumbent	Prabowo Subianto
**Minister of State Apparatus Utilization and Bureaucratic Reform**
**Rini Widyantini**	Minister of State Apparatus Utilization and Bureaucratic Reform	21 October 2024	Incumbent	Prabowo Subianto
**Minister of Tourism**
**Widiyanti Putri**	Minister of Tourism	21 October 2024	Incumbent	Prabowo Subianto

== Deputy Ministers ==
Deputy Minister	Position	Took office	Left office	Administration
Anny Ratnawati	Deputy Minister of Finance	20 May 2010	20 October 2014	Susilo Bambang Yudhoyono
Wiendu Nuryanti	Deputy Minister of Education and Culture	19 October 2011	20 October 2014	Susilo Bambang Yudhoyono
Angela Tanoesoedibjo	Deputy Minister of Tourism and Creative Economy	25 October 2019	20 October 2024	Joko Widodo
Ribka Haluk	Deputy Minister of Home Affairs	21 October 2024	Incumbent	Prabowo Subianto
Stella Christie	Deputy Minister of Higher Education, Science, and Technology	21 October 2024	Incumbent	Prabowo Subianto
Christina Aryani	Deputy Ministry of Indonesian Migrant Workers Protection/ Deputy Head of Indonesian Migrant Workers Protection Board	21 October 2024	Incumbent	Prabowo Subianto
Dyah Roro Esti	Deputy Minister of Trade	21 October 2024	Incumbent	Prabowo Subianto
Diana Kusumastuti	Deputy Minister of Public Works	21 October 2024	Incumbent	Prabowo Subianto
Isyana Bagoes Oka	Deputy Minister of Population and Family Development/ Deputy Head of National Population and Family Planning Board	21 October 2024	Incumbent	Prabowo Subianto
Ni Luh Puspa	Deputy Minister of Tourism	21 October 2024	Incumbent	Prabowo Subianto
Irene Umar	Deputy Minister of Creative Economy/ Deputy Head of Creative Economy Agency	21 October 2024	Incumbent	Prabowo Subianto
Veronica Tan	Deputy Minister of Women Empowerment and Child Protection	21 October 2024	Incumbent	Prabowo Subianto
Farida Farichah	Deputy Minister of Cooperatives	17 September 2025	Incumbent	Prabowo Subianto

== See also ==
- Cabinet
- Cabinet of Indonesia
- Politics of Indonesia
