= Rahayu =

Rahayu is an Indonesian and Malay surname and unisex given first name. Notable people with the name include:

== Surname ==
- Aries Susanti Rahayu (born 1995), Indonesian sport climbing athlete
- Apriyani Rahayu (born 1998), Indonesian female badminton player

== Given name ==
- Rahayu Mahzam (born 1980), Singaporean politician
- Rahayu Supanggah (born 1949), Indonesian composer
- Amelia Rahayu Murray (born 1993), Indonesian-New Zealander female singer known as Fazerdaze
- Endang Rahayu Sedyaningsih (1955–2012), Indonesian health minister from October 22, 2009 until April 30, 2012
