= Mboi =

Mboi or MboI may be,

- Mboi language
- Ben Mboi
- Nafsiah Mboi
- MboI a well-known restriction enzyme from the bacteria Moraxella bovis, used in biotechnology.
