= Terawan Agus Putranto =

Indonesian politician

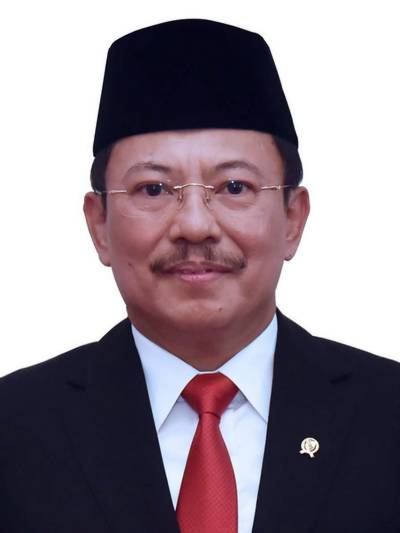

19th Health Minister of Indonesia
- In office 23 October 2019 – 23 December 2020
- President: Joko Widodo
- Preceded by: Nila Moeloek
- Succeeded by: Budi Gunadi Sadikin

Personal details
- Born: 5 August 1964 (age 62) Yogyakarta, Indonesia
- Spouse: Ester Dahlia
- Children: 1
- Education: Gadjah Mada University; Airlangga University; Hasanuddin University

Military service
- Allegiance: Indonesia
- Branch/service: Indonesian Army
- Years of service: 1990–2019
- Rank: Lieutenant General

Terawan Agus Putranto (born 5 August 1964) is an Indonesian physician who served as the Minister of Health of Indonesia between 23 October 2019 and 23 December 2020. He graduated from the Faculty of Medicine of Gajah Mada University and then joined the Indonesian Army as a military physician. Afterwards he studied Radiology in Airlangga University and obtained his doctoral degree in Hasanuddin University at 2013. He is a radiologist. He is the fourth Health Minister of Indonesia to have come from the military and the first since Suwardjono Surjaningrat, who was in office between 1978 and 1988. As Suwardjono and the two earlier officers were 2-star generals, Terawan, a 3-star general, is the highest-ranked military officer to have ever held this ministerial office.

== Positions ==
- Indonesian Presidential Medical Team, 2009.
- Chairperson of the Indonesian Radiology Specialist Association.
- Honorary chairman of the International Committee of Military Medicine.
- Chair of the ASEAN Association of Radiology.
- Head of the Gatot Soebroto Army Hospital, 2015.
- Minister of Health of Indonesia, 2019.

== Minister of Health of Indonesia ==
Indonesian President Joko Widodo appointed Terawan as Health Minister on 23 October 2019, having previously promoted him to the rank of Lieutenant General.

=== National Healthcare Insurance ===
Upon his appointment, Terawan promised to resolve a deficit in Indonesia's single-payer government healthcare program, BPJS Kesehatan; however, he was criticized when the government increased the premium for healthcare coverage. Terawan later said he had no solution for the program.

=== COVID-19 pandemic ===
During the COVID-19 pandemic, Terawan was involved in the government's successful effort to evacuate 188 Indonesians trapped on the World Dream cruise ship. He was criticized for quarantining Indonesians returning from Wuhan too close to residential areas, despite assurance from Indonesian government that the returning Indonesians were not infected. After a mandatory 14-days period of quarantine, all Indonesians quarantined were declared infection-free.

Terawan was criticized for stating that flu is more dangerous than COVID-19 because flu has a higher mortality rate. However, his initial response to the spread of COVID-19, such as the initial recommendation to not wear a mask, is quite aligned with other public health officials around the world including Anthony Fauci of the United States' NIH and general directions from the World Health Organization.

Terawan is also under fire for his "anti-science" and "arrogant" attitude in leading the COVID-19 crisis in Indonesia. He has the reputation to be bad in responding critics and input from the public. One of the cases is when he challenged a study done by Harvard University. Marc Lipsitch, epidemiologist from Harvard University, and three of his colleagues conducted research to determine locations around the world that could have undetected cases of the virus imported from abroad. Terawan comments on the study, "In my opinion, the suspicion is too far-fetched. Let Harvard to come here. The door is open for them to see. There is nothing we keep secret."

On 4 October 2020, a coalition of civil societies groups which consists of academics and social organizations calls for Terawan resignation for his alleged incompetence of COVID-19 handling. The group started a petition urging the president to fire the minister.

A controversial interview done by Najwa Shihab attracted national attention to the whereabouts of Minister Terawan during pandemic. The empty chair interview was the first to be performed in Indonesia. Even though there are reports about the interview, Shihab deemed her action as still a form of journalism.

On 22 December 2020, it was announced that Terawan was being replaced as Health Minister by Budi Gunadi Sadikin.

== Controversy ==
Prior to his appointment as minister, Terawan was known for his “brain-cleaning” treatment or intra-arterial cerebral flushing, a combination of digital subtraction angiography (DSA) and heparin injection for stroke patients. He claimed his method was effective as a treatment for stroke patients; however, since the first instance of this procedure being done was before any scientific study supporting the procedure being published, The Court of Medical Honour and Ethic (MKEK) of Indonesian Medical Association (IDI) deemed the practice unethical and issued a recommendation to suspend him for a year over a violation of three articles of the Indonesian Doctors Ethics Code.

In October 2019, Terawan was named as one of the candidates to be the next Minister of Health. IDI then wrote to Jokowi, suggesting that he should not be appointed as minister. However, Jokowi said that Terawan had met all criteria required to be a minister of health, and referred to his previous experience in managing budgets and human resources, including during his service as the Gatot Soebroto Army Hospital (RSPAD) director.

On 25 March 2022, the 31st General Assembly of IDI confirmed the MKEK recommendation and stripped Terawan of his membership. Without it, he will not be able to renew his medical license, which effectively bars him from practicing medicine in Indonesia.
