= Herling Laoh =

Indonesian bureaucrat and engineer (1902/1912–1970)

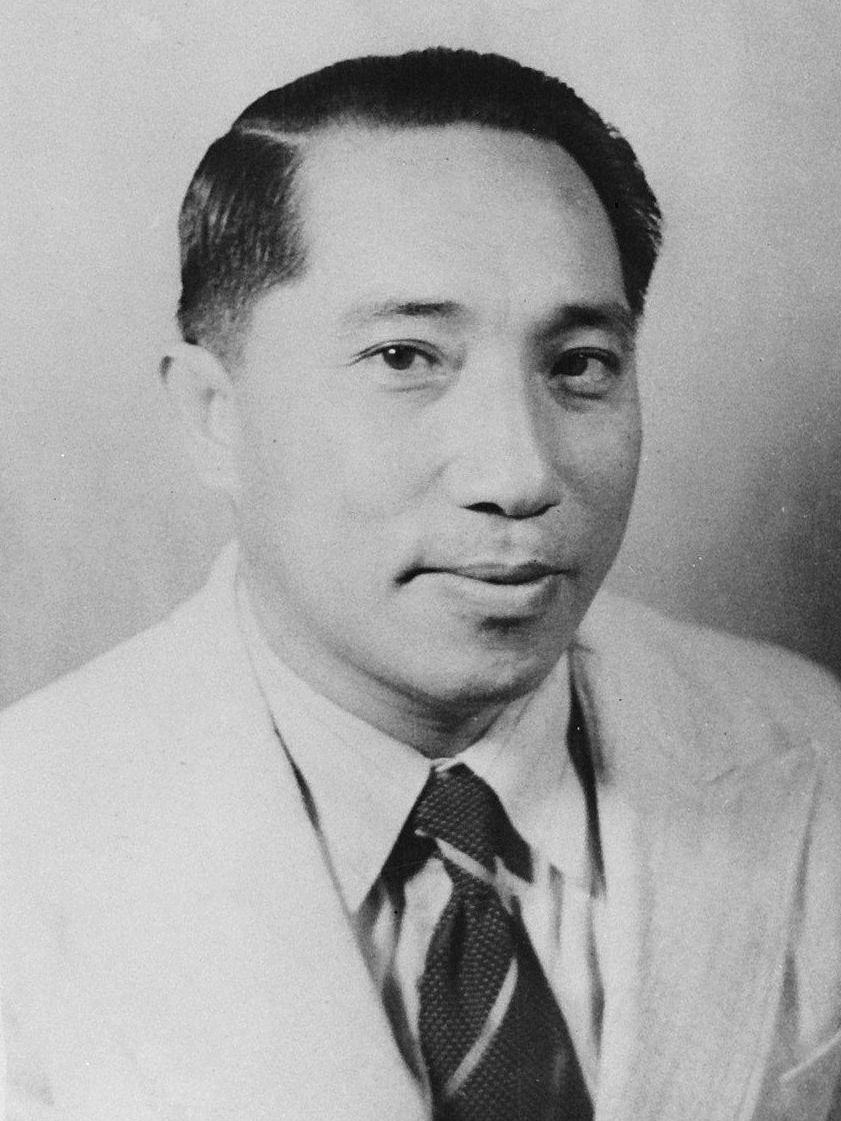
- Laoh in 1949

4th Minister of Transportation
- In office 4 August 1949 – 21 January 1950
- Prime Minister: Mohammad Hatta
- Preceded by: Djuanda Kartawidjaja
- Succeeded by: Djuanda Kartawidjaja

4th Minister of Public Works
- In office 11 August 1947 – 21 January 1950
- Prime Minister: Amir Sjarifuddin (1947–1948); Mohammad Hatta (1948–1950)
- Preceded by: Mohammad Enoch
- Succeeded by: Mananti Sitompul

Deputy Minister of Public Works
- In office 12 March 1946 – 11 August 1947
- Minister: Martinus Putuhena (1946–1947); Mohammad Enoch (Jul–Aug. 1947)
- Preceded by: Office established
- Succeeded by: Office abolished

Personal details
- Born: 1902/1912 (Note: According to A. Dahlan, Laoh was born on 23 August 1902. However, this account differs from other proposal for Lao's date of birth. According to Tamar Djaja, Laoh was born on 23 August 1912. Though this may have been a typographical error. Another account, this time by the Ministry of Public Works and Housing in a 2017 special edition of its magazine, Kiprah, it stated that Laoh was born 6 March 1905.) Tompaso, Manado Residency, Dutch East Indies
- Died: 15 March 1970 (aged 58/68)
- Party: Indonesian National Party
- Relations: Frits Laoh (brother)
- Education: Technische Hoogeschool te Bandoeng (THB)

Herling Laoh (1902/1912 – 15 March 1970) was an Indonesian bureaucrat and engineer. A member of the Indonesian National Party (PNI), Laoh served as minister of public works (1947–1950) and minister of transportation (1949–1950). Born to a goldsmith and his wife in present-day North Sulawesi, he studied civil engineering at the Technische Hoogeschool te Bandoeng (THB). After graduating in 1928, he worked as an engineer in various construction projects. Following the Proclamation of Indonesian Independence in 1945, he joined the PNI and served as a minister in several cabinets. He was later involved in PRRI/Permesta rebellion, becoming a state minister in the rebel government.

== Early life and career ==
Herling Laoh was born in the town of Tompaso, which was 45 km south-west of the city of Manado, in what is today Minahasa Regency. His date of birth is inconsistent, and varies from source to source, but is somewhere between 1902 and 1912. He was the son of a goldsmith and his wife, from Sonder, Tompaso. He was also the younger brother of Frits Laoh, a politician who also served as transportation minister under Burhanuddin Harahap. He began his education at a technical school, before entering the Europeesche Lagere School (ELS). He continued his education to the Prins Hendrik school (PHS), and later the Hogere Burgerschool (HBS). In May 1928, he graduated from the Technische Hoogeschool te Bandoeng (THB), the predecessor of the Bandung Institute of Technology (ITB), with a degree in Civil Engineering.

During his time there, he befriended future-President Sukarno. In 1937, Laoh became the assistant to H. S. C. De Vos, and worked on the waterbouwkunde in Bandung. Laoh would also establish three different construction companies, N.V. Birokopi, N.V. Perintis, and N.V. Paka. With the last two being joint ventures with the Dutch government. He continued working in construction, becoming the project engineer for an irrigation project, in Modjokerto, in what is today East Java, and the provincial engineer of water management in Garut and Palembang. During the Japanese occupation, Laoh lived in Tasikmalaya, continuing to work on construction projects.

== Later career and death ==
Following the Proclamation of Indonesian Independence, Loah joined the newly appointed President Sukarno's Indonesian National Party (PNI). He rose through the ranks of the party organization and was appointed Deputy Minister of Public Works and Housing, by Prime Minister Sutan Sjahrir in Sjahrir's Second Cabinet. He survived a reshuffle in June 1947, and remained as Deputy Minister under Amir Sjarifuddin Harahap. In 1948, he left the office of Deputy Minister to become Minister, replacing his former boss, Mohammad Enoch, who had resigned. He was briefly replaced by Djuanda Kartawidjaja in the first cabinet of Vice President Mohammad Hatta, who served in an acting capacity, but he returned to his position 13 April 1948. During the leadership of the Second Hatta Cabinet, in addition to being minister of Public Works, he was also designated minister of Transportation.

In 1947, Laoh with Deputy Prime Minister Adnan Kapau Gani left Indonesia to go to Havana, Cuba. To attend the economic conference which was held there. During the Second Dutch offensive, which saw the capture of the capital Yogyakarta. This resulted in most of the government being arrested, including Loah. He, and the rest of the government, were eventually released following the signing of the Renville Agreement. In 1949, he participated in the historic transfer of sovereignty from Dutch authorities to Indonesian authorities. In his later life, he would become more critical of President Sukarno's increasing authoritarianism, and Guided Democracy system. In 1958, he joined in the PRRI/Permesta Rebellion in Sulawesi, and took office as State Minister. Though he was arrested, he was released by President Suharto in 1967. On 15 March 1970, he died at the age of 65.
