= Achmad Sujudi =

Indonesian physician (1941–2023)

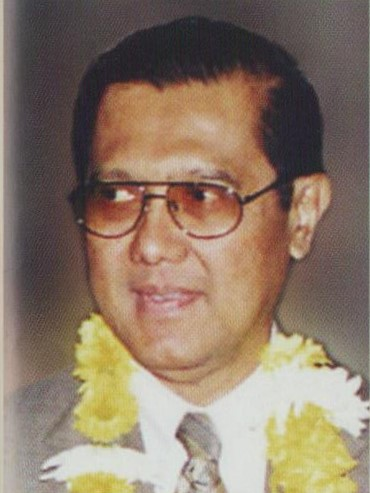

Minister of Health
- In office 26 October 1999 – 20 October 2004
- President: Abdurrahman Wahid; Megawati Sukarnoputri
- Preceded by: Farid Anfasa Moeloek
- Succeeded by: Siti Fadilah Supari

Director General for the Eradication of Infectious Diseases and Environmental Sanitation of Settlements
- In office 26 June 1998 – 26 October 1999
- Preceded by: Hadi Maryanto Abednego
- Succeeded by: Umar Fahmi Achmadi

Personal details
- Born: 11 April 1941 Bondowoso, Dutch East Indies
- Died: 2 May 2023 (aged 82) South Tangerang, Banten, Indonesia
- Spouse: Sulistiani
- Children: 2
- Education: University of Indonesia (drs.); University of New South Wales (MHA)
- Occupation: Physician

Achmad Sujudi (11 April 1941 – 2 May 2023) was an Indonesian physician who served as Indonesia's health minister from 1999 until 2004. Previously, he had been appointed to lead several government hospitals and became a director general in the Department of Health.

== Early life and education ==
Achmad Sujudi was born on 11 April 1941 in Bondowoso, East Java. His parents, Musdari Darmoprawiro and Kusniati, worked as teachers at the local people's school (equivalent to elementary school). As his parents were teachers, he was immediately put at the 3rd grade in the people's school and completed his basic education in 1954. In addition to attending formal schools, he was also educated in madrasa and pesantren.

Sujudi continued his education at the Bondowoso State Junior High School in 1957, the only junior high school in Bondowoso. Later in 1960, he attended the Malang State High School, which was considered the best high school in East Java.

After graduating from high school, Sujudi began studying medicine at the University of Indonesia. He received a scholarship from the government, which covered most of his expenses. He also joined student movements in the mid-1960s, which aimed to overthrow the Sukarno regime. He graduated from the university in 1972 as a doctor. He later continued his education at the University of New South Wales in Sydney, Australia, where he obtained his master's degree in Health Services Management in 1990.

== Career ==
=== Doctor and hospital head ===
After graduating from the Faculty of Medicine at the University of Indonesia, Achmad Sujudi began his career as a physician. He started his career as a physician on the remote island of Buru in 1972. In 1974, he wrote a review on the health conditions of political prisoners being detained there, which was later published by the Prisma journal. Sujudi wrote that some of the prisoners, who were supposed to be healthy, suffered from diseases such as bronchial asthma and diabetes. He also pointed out the lack of healthcare and medical facilities in the island.

Sujudi left the Buru island in 1973 to work as a surgeon at the Persahabatan public hospital in Jakarta. After six years there, he returned to the University of Indonesia and studied surgery for about a year until 1980.

Upon completing his surgical education, Sujudi was asked by Bengkulu governor Soeprapto to become a surgeon in Bengkulu's central hospital. Two years after his arrival there, Sujudi became the head of the hospital. He would led the hospital for twelve years, overseeing its development from a small provincial central hospital to a second-grade central hospital. During the process, the hospital continuously won awards from the Department of Health. He also oversaw several health foundations based in the province. Sujudi himself wanted to be transferred away from Bengkulu, but Governor Soeprapto insisted that he should remain there, stating a reduction in complaints from patients during his leadership of the hospital.

Sujudi eventually left Bengkulu on 16 May 1994, and on the next month he was appointed to lead the Dr. Sardjito Hospital, a larger government hospital in Yogyakarta. He experienced several difficulties in managing doctors in the university, as most of the doctors were Gadjah Mada University graduates, while he was a University of Indonesia graduate.

=== Director-general and minister ===
After the fall of the Suharto regime, Achmad Sujudi was then appointed as the Director General of Eradication of Communicable Diseases and Residential Environment Health at the Department of Health from 1998 to 1999.

Achmad Sujudi's political career began when he was appointed as the Minister of Health and Social Welfare by President Abdurrahman Wahid (Gus Dur) in 1999. He served as the minister from 1999 to 2001. When Megawati Soekarnoputri became the President of Indonesia, Achmad Sujudi was again appointed as the Minister of Health in the Gotong Royong Cabinet from 2001 to 2004.

== Personal life and death ==
Sujudi was married to Sulistiani in 1973. The couple has two children.

Sujudi died on the morning of 2 May 2023 at the Pondok Indah Hospital in South Tangerang, Banten. He was 82. Prior to his death, Sujudi suffered a stroke in early 2023. Several former and incumbent officials, including health ministers Budi Gunadi Sadikin and Faried Anfasa Moeloek, paid their final homages at Sujudi's house. His body was interred a day later at the Karawang Public Cemetery.
