= APLMA =

APLMA is an acronym which can refer to:

- Asia Pacific Leaders Malaria Alliance, a health organisation
- Asia Pacific Loan Market Association, a finance trade association
