= Mien Sugandhi =

Indonesian politician (1934–2020)

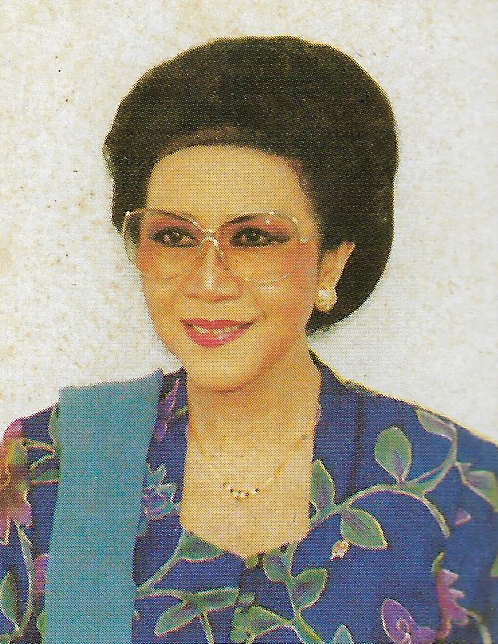
- Portrait, 1993

State Minister of Women's Affairs
- In office 17 March 1993 – 16 March 1998
- President: Suharto
- Preceded by: Sulaskin Murpratomo
- Succeeded by: Tutty Alawiyah

Member of the House of Representatives
- In office 1 October 1987 – 17 March 1993
- Succeeded by: Mustokoweni Murdi
- Constituency: East Java

Personal details
- Born: 28 July 1934 Magelang, Dutch East Indies
- Died: 5 January 2020 (aged 85) Jakarta, Indonesia
- Party: MKGR (1998)
- Other political affiliations: Golkar (before 1998)

Photo of Mien Sugandhi

Mien Sugandhi (28 July 1934 – 5 January 2020) was an Indonesian politician who served as the State Minister of Women's Affairs from March 1993 to March 1998 under President Suharto's rule.

In 1977, Sugandhi was elected to the Dewan Perwakilan Rakyat (DPR). She was also a member of People's Consultative Assembly. She retained her DPR membership till 1993, when Indonesian President Suharto appointed her State Minister of Women's Affairs in his Sixth Development Cabinet. For her services in this capacity, Sugandhi received the government honour Bintang Mahaputra Adipradana in 1996.

Following the May 1998 riots of Indonesia, Sugandhi was one of the prominent politicians who called for Suharto's resignation as President. In 2001, she received her doctoral degree from Northern California Global University. Sugandhi was the President Commissioner of two Indonesian companies; Mitra Adiperkasa and Panen Lestari Internusa.

On 5 January 2020, Sugandhi died at the Gatot Soebroto Army Hospital at age 85.

== Personal life ==
Mien was married to Indonesian general R.H. Sugandhi Kartosubroto, who was also the chairman of military welfare organisation MKGR. After his death in 1991, Sugandhi became its chairperson.
