= Farid Anfasa Moeloek =

Indonesian academic and physician

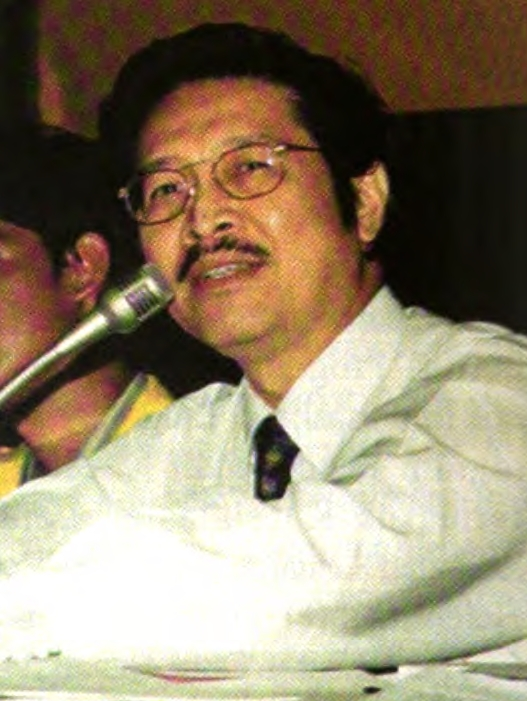
- Farid in 1998

Minister of Health
- In office 16 March 1998 – 20 October 1999
- President: Suharto; B. J. Habibie
- Preceded by: Sujudi
- Succeeded by: Achmad Sujudi

Director of the Postgraduate Programme of the University of Indonesia
- In office 1996–1998
- Preceded by: Iskandar Wahidiyat
- Succeeded by: Wahyuning Ramelan

Personal details
- Born: June 28, 1944 (age 82) Liwa, Lampung, Dutch East Indies
- Spouse: Nila Moeloek
- Children: 3
- Parents: Abdul Moeloek Soetan Anjoeng (father); Poeti Alam Naisjah Tahar Moeloek (mother)
- Education: University of Indonesia (dr, Dr, Prof)

Academic background
- Thesis: Laparoscopy in the clinical investigation of infertile women (1983)
- Doctoral advisor: Hanifa Wiknjosastro; Ratna Suprapti Samil

Academic work
- Discipline: Medicine
- Sub-discipline: Obstetrics and gynaecology

Farid Anfasa Moeloek (born 28 June 1944) is an Indonesian physician and professor of obstetrics and gynaecology at the University of Indonesia. He was Indonesia's minister of health from 1998 to 1999, serving in the last cabinet of President Suharto and president B. J. Habibie's cabinet.

== Early life ==
Farid was born on 28 June 1944 in Winong village in Liwa, Lampung, as the second youngest child of Abdul Moeloek Soetan Anjoeng, a physician, and Poeti Alam Naisjah, a teacher. Almost all of Farid's family members were physicians, with his brother, Nukman Moeloek, being a physician and professor of andrology at the University of Indonesia. His uncle, Sutan Assin, was a surgeon, and his cousins were also physicians.

Farid's father, Abdoel Moeloek, migrated to the Winong village in hopes of evading arrest from Japanese forces, who targeted Indonesian intellectuals. During their stay in the village, Farid's parents provide free healthcare and education services, earning them respect from the village populace. His father also adopted children from the village. Following the independence of Indonesia in 1945, their family migrated to Tanjungkarang, the capital of Lampung. Abdoel took over the city's central hospital from the hands of the Japanese forces and became its head. During the Indonesian National Revolution, Farid recalled his father treating wounded soldiers from both sides along with the hospital staff, which inspired him to become a physician. After his father's death in 1973, the Lampung provincial council decided to name the hospital after him.

Farid spent his childhood in Tanjungkarang, completing his basic education from the Xaverius elementary school to state high school in the city. As a child, Farid was known as an avid photographer and learner. He was given the nickname Yip due to his rhotacism.

== Education ==
After completing high school, Farid studied civil engineering at the Bandung Institute of Technology. Three months in the institute, Farid requested to drop out, stating that he wanted to pursue a different career path from his other brother, who had already been an engineer. His father approved his choice via telegram, and he moved to Jakarta to study medicine at the University of Indonesia. He graduated from the university in 1970 and received his license as a physician specializing in obstetrics and gynaecology in 1976.

After completing formal medicine education, Farid also attended a number of courses abroad. He attended a course on fertility management and mother and childcare held by the World Health Organization in Singapore in 1977, on infertility management and gynaecologic microsurgery at the Johns Hopkins University in Baltimore in 1979, and on operative endoscopy in fertility and infertility at the Elisabeth Hospital in Hamburg in 1980. During his studies abroad, Farid praised these countries for having superior health services in comparison to Indonesia but urged Indonesia to consider its domestic situation prior to procuring the kind of health facilities found in these countries.

On 22 October 1983, Farid officially received his doctorate degree after defending his dissertation titled Laparoscopy in the clinical investigation of infertile women. In his dissertation, Farid offered laparoscopy, which was a new technology in Indonesia at that time, as a solution for infertile women. The dissertation, which was advised by Hanifa Wiknjosastro and Ratna Suprapti Samil, received the cum laude distinction from its examiners.

== Career ==
Farid began teaching general medicine at the University of Indonesia in 1971 and at the Department of Obstetrics and Gynaecology since 1976. Farid practiced obstetrics and gynaecology at the faculty's reproductive health clinic in Cikini, where he became its head from 1981 to 1984. In 1981, Farid successfully conducted the first fallopian tube recanalization operation in Indonesia.

Farid also taught at a course held jointly between the university and WHO in 1981 and the director of a reproductive course, held jointly between the health department, National Family Planning Coordinating Board, the faculty, and the Johns Hopkins University from 1981 to 1984. He was also a member of organizations related to family planning, obstetrics and gynaecology, and fertility. For his work on family planning, on 17 August 1979 Farid received an award from Jakarta governor Tjokropranolo. He later received honorary memberships from the International Society for Human Reproduction and Society of Fallopian Tube in Health and Disease in 1993.

Farid held a number of academic positions at the University of Indonesia, serving as the head of the medicine faculty's computer unit. On 11 September 1990, Farid was appointed as assistant director for academic affairs in the university's postgraduate programme by rector Sujudi. During his tenure, Farid was promoted to the rank of full professor 31 July 1994. At his inaugural speech as a full professor on 18 January 1995, Farid advocated for a systems approach to understanding reproductive health, emphasizing the interconnectedness of various systems, including the organism, personality, social, and cultural systems.

Six years later, Farid was promoted as the director of the programme, replacing Iskandar Wahidiyat. As director, Farid focused on the internationalizing the programme by aligning curriculum and research with global standards, as well as developing the quality of its human resources and establishing new majors. He also proposed the establishment of a science park in the university's campus.

== Personal life ==
Farid is married to Nila Djuwita, the third of five children of Nizar Sutan Tumanggung, a professor in otorhinolaryngology, on 11 February 1972. Farid met Nila at the medicine's faculty student orientation event. At that time, Farid was a member of the orientation committee, while Nila was a freshman. The couple has three children: Muhammad Reiza Moeloek, Puti Alifa Moeloek, Puti Annisa Moeloek, all working as engineers.

== Honors ==
- Star of Mahaputera, 2nd Class (Indonesian: Bintang Mahaputera Adipradana) (13 August 1999)
