= Iskandar Wahidiyat =

Indonesian academic and pediatrician

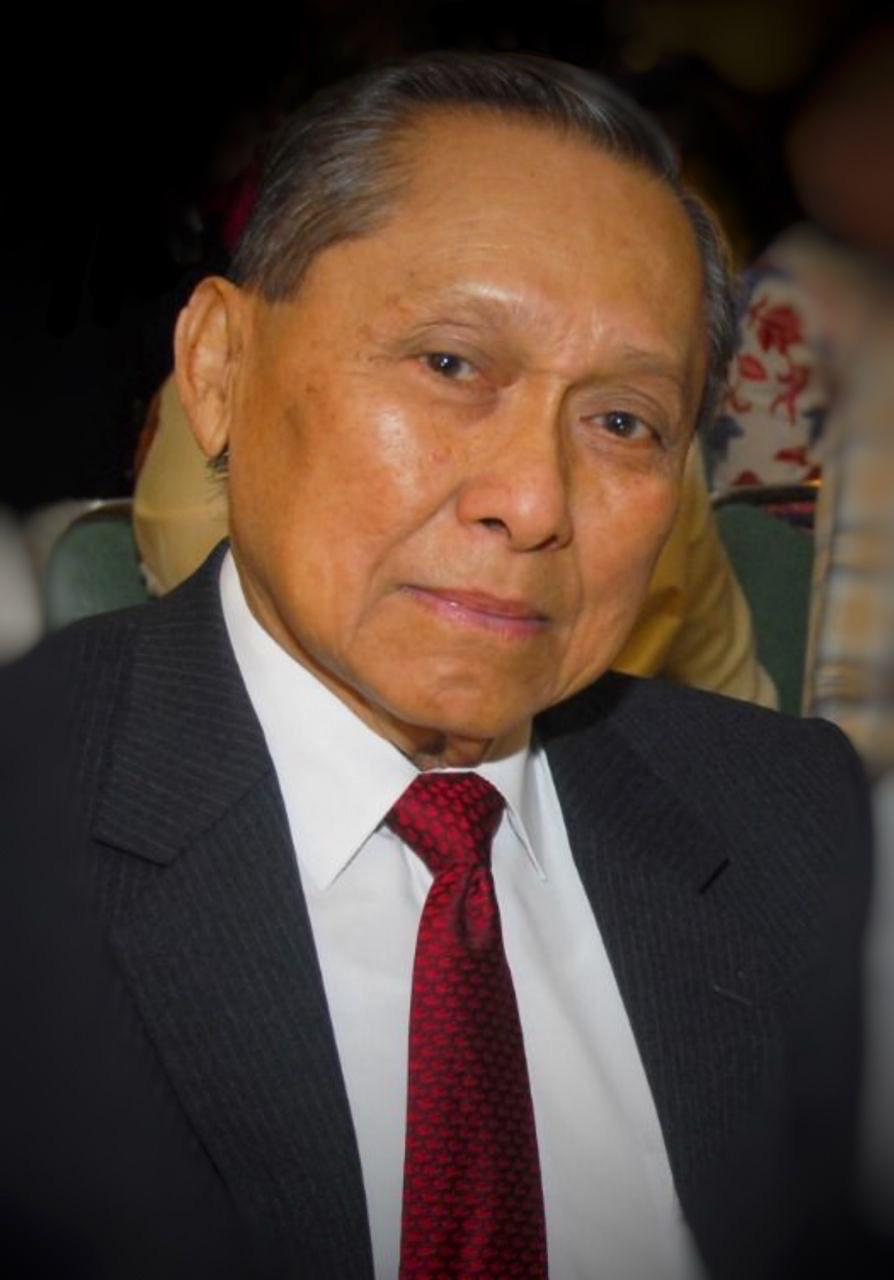

Director of the Postgraduate Programme of the University of Indonesia
- In office 1989–1996
- Preceded by: Gunawan Ardhi Wardhana
- Succeeded by: Farid Anfasa Moeloek

Personal details
- Born: November 5, 1932 Serang, West Java, Dutch East Indies
- Died: January 30, 2021 (aged 88) Jakarta, Indonesia
- Spouse: Wasilah Iskandar
- Parent: Oesman Joedakoesoemah (father)
- Education: University of Indonesia (dr, Dr, Prof)

Academic background
- Thesis: Research on Thalassemia in Jakarta (1979)
- Doctoral advisor: Asri Rasad; Achmad Husen Markum

Academic work
- Discipline: Medicine
- Sub-discipline: Pediatrics

Iskandar Wahidiyat (5 November 1932 – 30 January 2021) was an Indonesian academic and professor of pediatrics at the University of Indonesia. Iskandar was known for his research on thalassemia, which earned him the 2006 Bakrie Award, and as the head of the first successful conjoined twin surgery team in Indonesia, which earned him an award from the Minister of Education. Iskandar was the director of the University of Indonesia postgraduate program from 1989 to 1996.

== Early life and education ==
Iskandar was born on 5 November 1932 in Serang as the son of Oesman Joedakoesoemah, an elementary school teacher who would later become the Minister of Education and Religious Affairs in the State of Pasundan and chief of culture in Indonesia's education ministry. Iskandar completed his elementary school education in Cirebon, before following his father to Bandung and completing his junior high school and high school school there.

After graduating from high school in 1952, Iskandar decided to study maths and natural sciences at the University of Indonesia in Bandung. He dropped out after a year and opted to study medicine at the University of Indonesia in Jakarta. During his time as a student, Iskandar joined the health section of the medicine student senate. He graduated as a physician in 1960.

== Career ==
Iskandar began his career as an assistant professor at the department of pediatrics in 1959. From 1962 to 1963, he studied hematology at LMU Munich under the supervision of Klaus Betke. He received his license as a pediatrician in 1964 and became a permanent lecturer in the pediatrics department. He returned to LMU for advanced training in pediatric hematology under Betke from 1969 to 1970.

By the late 1970s, Iskandar was the head of the hematology subdivision in the faculty. He received his doctorate after defending his thesis on 10 November 1979, which was the result of a 19 year of research on thalassemia in Jakarta. In his thesis, Iskandar advocated for comprehensive program to handle thalassemia disorder on the general population. Five years later, Iskandar was appointed as a full professor in pediatrics of the university. By this time, Iskandar was entrusted to head the department of pediatrics in the university.

In October 1987, Iskandar was appointed to lead the team for the Yuliana-Yuliani conjoined twins separation surgery, with surgeon Padmosantjojo as his deputy. Despite his background as a pediatrician, Padmosantjojo lauded the choice of Iskandar as the team leader, as he argued that Iskandar was only responsible for the coordination of equipments and logistics and not the surgical operation.

The surgery process began on the morning of 21 October 1987 and lasted for seven hours, with four hours to stitch the head of the already separated conjoined twin. Iskandar compared Padmo's meticulousness during the surgery to a "soldier patiently conquering enemy defenses inch by inch". The surgery marked the first time a conjoined twin was successfully separated in Indonesia, and a rare instance globally, as both twins still lived to this day. The success led the team to receive an award from Minister of Education and Culture, Fuad Hassan, in December that year.

Both Iskandar and Padmosantjojo was promoted after the successful surgery, with Iskandar being appointed as the dean of the University of Indonesia's postgraduate faculty in 1989. On 30 July 1990, the government issued a regulation which changed the name of the faculty to a program—the postgraduate program of the University of Indonesia. Accordingly, Iskandar's post was changed to the director of the postgraduate program in 1991. As dean, Iskandar oversaw the establishment of the Japanese area studies under the program in 1990 with sponsor from the Japan Foundation, and the women studies, which was headed by former dean of the psychology faculty Saparinah Sadli. He was also involved the establishment of the Japanese Studies Center at the Depok campus of the university.

== Later life ==
After his retirement, Iskandar continued to support efforts in combating thalassemia in Indonesia, which led to him receiving the 2006 Bakrie Award. He also served as the chief advisor to the Indonesia Care for Cancer Kids Foundation.

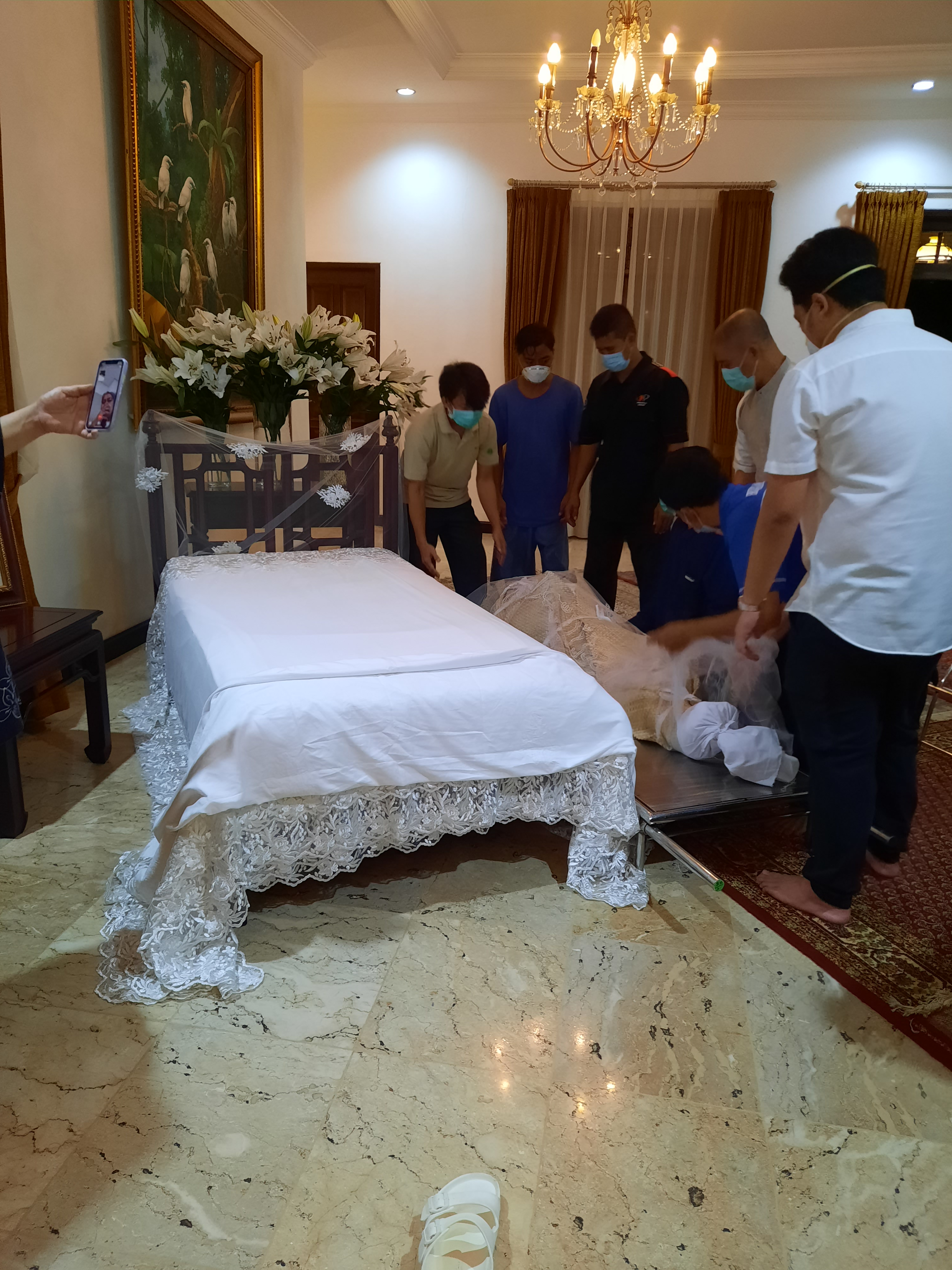
Iskandar's body being laid at his house

Iskandar died on 30 January 2021 at the Pondok Indah Hospital in Jakarta. Iskandar had been treated in hospital due to his illness five days prior to his death. He was buried at the Jeruk Purut Lama public cemetery the next day.
