= Deputy Minister of State-Owned Enterprises (Indonesia) =

Deputy Minister of State-Owned Enterprises of Indonesia was a position that assists the Minister of State-Owned Enterprises. This position was first created during the Second United Indonesia Cabinet. The position is dissolved on 2 October 2025.

== List of deputy ministers ==
On 19 October 2011, President Susilo Bambang Yudhoyono formed the Deputy Minister of State Owned Enterprises by appointing Mahmuddin Yasin as the first person to serve. He was appointed to make BUMN the driving force of the national economy. The following individuals have been appointed Deputy Minister of State Owned Enterprises, or any of its precedent titles:

Political party: Independent

| No. | Portrait | Name (Birth–Death) | Political party | Title | Took office | Left office | Cabinet | Note |
|---|---|---|---|---|---|---|---|---|
| 1 | | Mahmuddin Yasin (b. 1954) | Independent | Deputy Minister of State Owned Enterprises | 19 October 2011 | 20 October 2014 | Second United Indonesia | |
| 2 | | Budi Gunadi Sadikin (b. 1964) | Independent | First Deputy Minister of State Owned Enterprises | 25 October 2019 | 23 December 2020 | Onward Indonesia | (Note: Appointed as Minister of Health on 23 December 2023) |
| 2 | | Kartika Wirjoatmodjo (b. 1973) | Independent | Second Deputy Minister of State-Owned Enterprises | 25 October 2019 | 17 July 2023 | Onward Indonesia | |
| 2 | | Kartika Wirjoatmodjo (b. 1973) | Independent | First Deputy Minister of State-Owned Enterprises | 17 July 2023 | 20 October 2024 | Onward Indonesia | |
| 3 | | Pahala Mansury (b. 1971) | Independent | First Deputy Minister of State Owned Enterprises | 23 December 2020 | 17 July 2023 | Onward Indonesia | (Note: Appointed as Deputy Minister of Foreign Affairs on 17 July 2023) |
| 4 | | Rosan Roeslani | Independent | Second Deputy Minister of State-Owned Enterprises | 17 July 2023 | 25 October 2023 | Onward Indonesia | (Note: Resigned after becoming the Chair of the Prabowo-Gibran Success Team for the 2024 Presidential Election.) |
| (2) | | Kartika Wirjoatmodjo | Independent | First Deputy Minister of State-Owned Enterprises | 21 October 2024 | 2 October 2025 | Red and White | |
| 5 | | Aminuddin Ma'ruf | Independent | Second Deputy Minister of State-Owned Enterprises | 21 October 2024 | 2 October 2025 | Red and White | |
| 5 | | Dony Oskaria | Independent | Third Deputy Minister of State-Owned Enterprises | 21 October 2024 | 2 October 2025 | Red and White | |
