= Mananti Sitompul =

Indonesian politician and minister

Ir. Mananti Sitompul
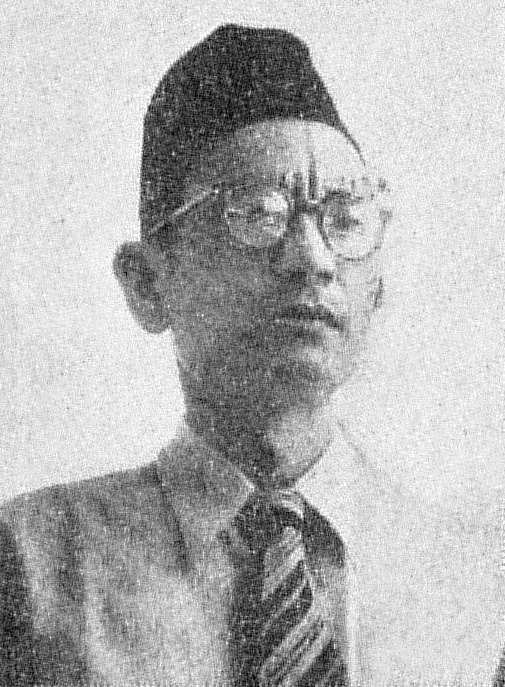
- Official portrait, c. 1950

5th Minister of Public Works and Housing
- In office 21 January 1950 – 6 September 1950
- President: Sukarno
- Prime Minister: Abdul Halim
- Preceded by: Herling Laoh
- Succeeded by: Herman Johannes
- In office 19 December 1948 – 13 July 1949
- Executive: Sjafruddin Prawiranegara
- Preceded by: Herling Laoh
- Succeeded by: Herling Laoh

Minister of Health (acting)
- In office 19 December 1948 – 14 March 1949
- Executive: Sjafruddin Prawiranegara
- Preceded by: Johannes Leimena
- Succeeded by: Soekiman Wirjosandjojo

Personal details
- Born: Mananti Sitompoel; 9 June 1909 Pahae, North Tapanuli, Dutch East Indies
- Died: 27 February 1980 (aged 70)
- Party: Christian Party (Parkindo)
- Education: Technische Hoogeschool te Bandoeng (THB)
- Occupation: Politician

Mananti Sitompul (EVO: Mananti Sitompoel; 9 June 1909 – 27 February 1980), was a Christian Indonesian politician from North Sumatra. A member of the Indonesian Christian Party (Parkindo), he served in several national cabinets during the Indonesian National Revolution. Born in Pahae, North Tapanuli, he studied at the Technische Hoogeschool te Bandoeng (THB), and graduated as a civil engineer in 1939. Subsequently, he worked at the Waterloopkundig Laboratory and later at the Waterstaatsdienst. During the Japanese occupation, he became the head of the Provinciale Waterstaat of West Java, before he moved to Sukabumi and later Jakarta, to work in the Public works office.

Following the proclamation of independence, he served as the deputy head of the West Java Ministry of Public Works. He moved to Pematangsiantar, and later Bukittinggi, and became the head of the Sumatra Ministry of Public Works. In 1948, following the capture of the capital of Yogyakarta by Dutch forces, he was appointed both Minister of Public Works and Minister of Health, replacing Herling Laoh and Johannes Leimena respectively. He was replaced as health minister by Soekiman Wirjosandjojo, and after the signing of the Roem–Van Roijen Agreement, was replaced as Public Works minister after the restoration of Minister Herling Laoh. He returned to government in 1950, in the Halim Cabinet, and served as Public Works minister again until the dissolution of the cabinet. He died in 1980.

== Early life and youth ==
Mananti Sitompul was born in Pahae, in what is today North Tapanuli Regency, North Sumatra. He was the first and only child of a poor peasant family in the Sumatran mountains. When he was 5 years old, his father died, and his schooling at Hollandsch-Inlandsche School Tapanuli (HIS) was funded by his mother. He graduated from HIS in 1925 and continued his education at the Meer Uitgebreid Lager Onderwijs Padang. However, his mother was unable to pay taxes and Mananti's transportation fees, so he continued his education by receiving student scholarships (beurs). He graduated from MULO in 1929 and then attended the Algemene Middelbare School in Yogyakarta (AMS). He received a scholarship from the Rijstfonds to study at the Technische Hoogeschool te Bandoeng (THB) in 1935. There, he struggled to pass his classes and almost lost his scholarship. However, he was helped by a family member, and he graduated from TBH in 1939, with a degree in Civil Engineering. After graduating, he worked in the field of water management at the Waterloopkundig Laboratory ("Hydraulic laboratory"), at THB. Then, he later worked at the Provinciale Waterstaat, and later at the Waterstaatsdienst.

== Political career ==
During the Japanese occupation of the country, he became the head of the Provinciale Waterstaat of West Java, before moving to Sukabumi and later Jakarta, to work in the Public works office. Following the Proclamation of Indonesian Independence and the establishment of a Republican government, he moved back to West Java and served as the deputy head of the West Java Ministry of Public Works. He left Java for his homeland of Northern Sumatra and arrived at Pematangsiantar. During Operation Product, he was arrested in Pematangsiantar and was arrested in Medan. In November 1947, he was expelled from Medan and was forced to go to Singapore. In December 1947, he left Singapore and went to Jambi. He was arrested again in Tanjung Pinang, Riau Islands, before heading to Bukittinggi. It was in Sumatra where he became the head of the province's Ministry of Public Works.

In 1948, Dutch forces captured the capital city of Yogyakarta, and the mass arrest of the Indonesian government, an Emergency Government-in-exile was established by Minister of Finance Sjafruddin Prawiranegara in Sumatra. As the head of the province's Ministry of Public Works, he was appointed the Minister of Public Works and Minister of Health by Sjafruddin. At that time, he was the only health minister without any medical-related experience until the appointment of Budi Gunadi Sadikin in 2020. As minister, he attempted to fix the damage from the Indonesian National Revolution, and develop or add jobs for the benefit of the country. He was replaced as health minister by Soekiman Wirjosandjojo in March 1949, and after the signing of the Roem–Van Roijen Agreement, was replaced as Public Works minister after the restoration of Minister Herling Laoh. He returned to government in 1950, in the Halim Cabinet, and served as Public Works minister again until the dissolution of the cabinet. He died on 27 February 1980 and was buried at the Bukit Barisan Heroes Cemetery in Medan, North Sumatra.
