= Gunawan Ardhi Wardhana =

Indonesian academic and professor (born 1932)

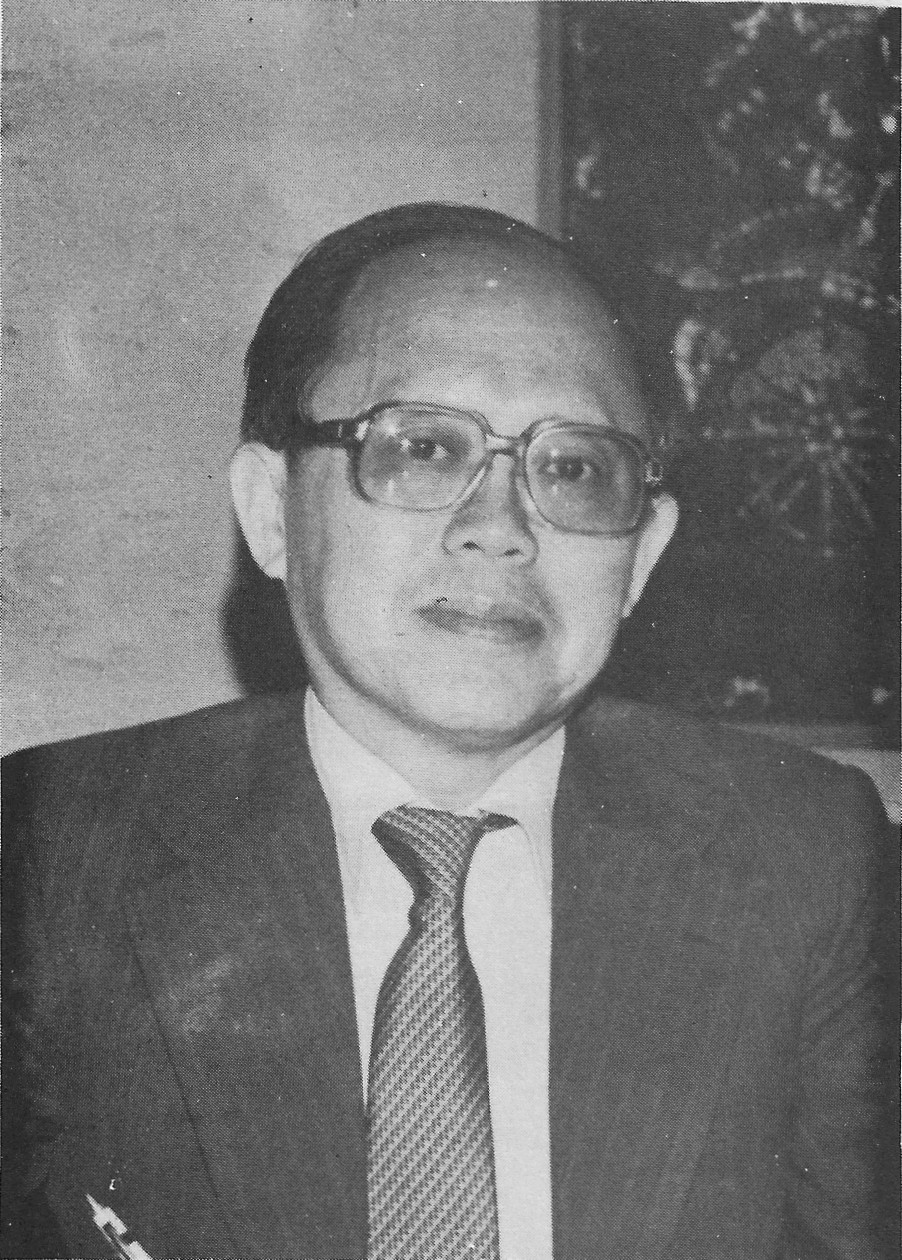

Dean of the Postgraduate Faculty of the University of Indonesia
- In office 22 November 1982 – 1989
- Preceded by: office established
- Succeeded by: Iskandar Wahidiyat

Personal details
- Born: October 16, 1932 Surakarta, Central Java, Dutch East Indies
- Died: September 14, 1991 (aged 58)
- Spouse: Anna Wardhana
- Education: University of Indonesia (S.E., Prof); University of California, Berkeley (MBA, PhD)

Academic background
- Thesis: The Effects of Politics on Educational Development in Indonesia: From the Colonial Period to the Present (1511-1971) (1973)

Academic work
- Discipline: Economics
- Sub-discipline: Business economics Management
- Notable students: Nasrudin Sumintapura

Gunawan Ardhi Wardhana, born Ang Giok Goen (Chinese: 洪玉銀; pinyin: Hóng Yù Yín; 26 October 1932 – 14 September 1991) was an Indonesian academic and professor of economics at the University of Indonesia. He was the inaugural dean of the postgraduate faculty of the University of Indonesia, serving from its establishment in 1982 until 1989.

== Early life and education ==
Wardhana was born in Surakarta on 26 October 1932 as the eldest son of Ang Poo Hin and Ong Jan Nio. Wardhana was raised in Surakarta and completed his elementary and middle school in the city before moving to Jakarta for high school. He studied at the 4th State High School in Gambir and graduated in 1952. He then studied business economics at the University of Indonesia on the same year after graduating from high school.

On his second year, Wardhana began working as a student assistant at the faculty's library. By November 1954, he had already become a monthly-paid employee of the faculty and obtained his baccalaureate (sarjana muda, lit. 'young bachelor', equivalent to an associate degree in the Western higher education system) in 1955. Gunawan received a full bachelor's degree in economics three years later and was made a full employee of the university shortly afterwards.

Wardhana, along with several other assistant lecturers from the faculty, were sent to study at the University of California, Berkeley, with a scholarship from the Ford Foundation. Wardhana studied for two years and received his Master of Business Administration from the university in 1960. Some of the lecturers who were sent there became part of President Suharto's cabinet and was involved in formulating Indonesia's economic and monetary policies, earning them the nickname Berkeley Mafia. Wardhana's cohort of the Berkeley Mafia includes finance minister Ali Wardhana, national development planning minister J. B. Sumarlin, and manpower minister Harun Al Rasyid Zain. Economist Jusuf Pang Lay Kim, who was the father of trade minister Mari Elka Pangestu, was also part of Wardhana's cohort.

== Career ==
Upon his return from the United States, Wardhana began teaching at the university. Among the students that he taught was Nasrudin Sumintapura, who later became the deputy minister of finance in Suharto's Fifth Development Cabinet. He became the chair of the business economics department in the faculty from 1961 to 1963 and again from 1968 to 1970. He briefly became the co-director of the Management Development Training in the faculty from 1962 to 1963. He returned to University of California, Berkeley for his doctoral studies and received his doctorate in 1973, with a thesis titled The Effects of Politics on Educational Development in Indonesia: From the Colonial Period to the Present (1511-1971).

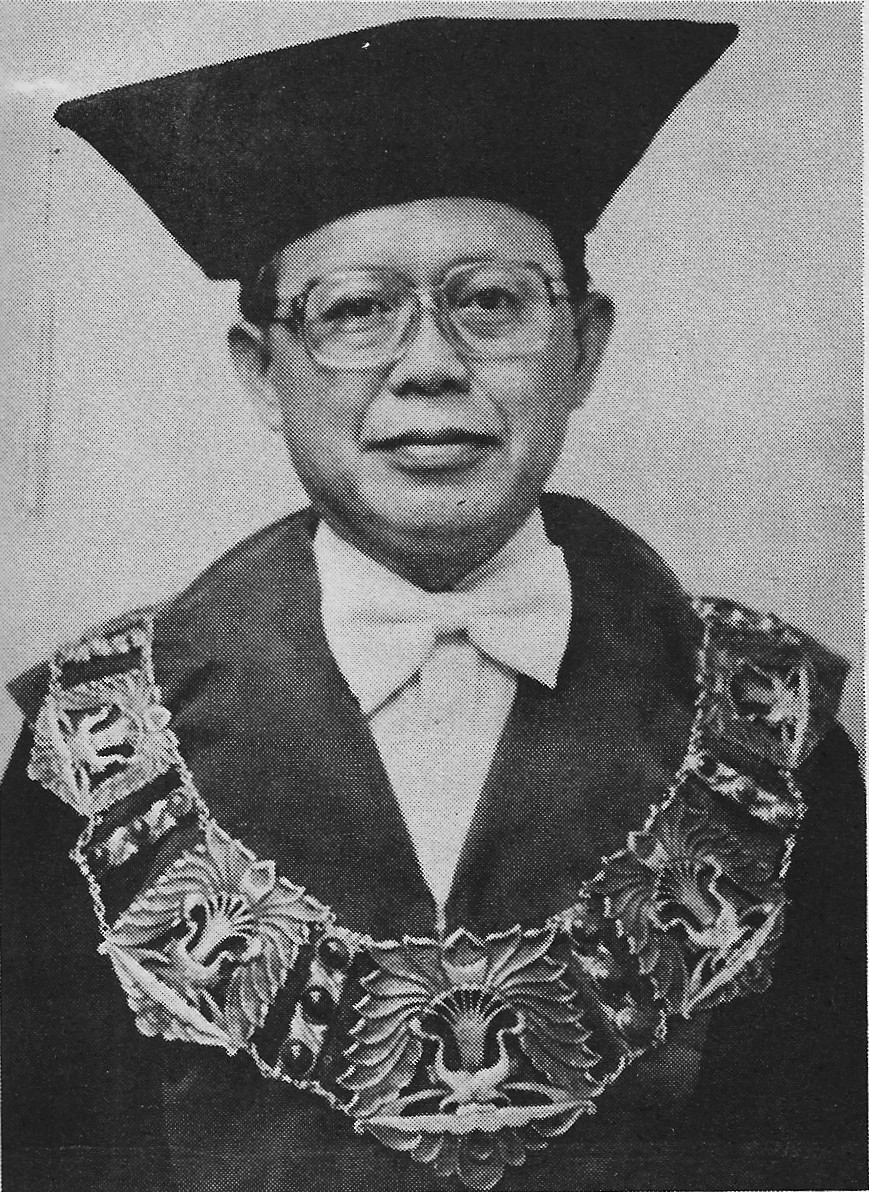
Gunawan Ardhi Wardhana in his academic robe.

After completing his doctoral studies, Wardhana was entrusted with several academic position: the chair of the business economics department from 1973 to 1978 and the director of the faculty's extension programme from 1973 until 1984. Aside from his managerial positions, Wardhana was also instrumental in developing the faculty's management institute. On 1 March 1980, Wardhana was appointed as a full professor in economics, with his inaugural speech titled The Micro and Macro Aspects : Applications of Human Resources Approach in Indonesia. Two years later, on 22 November 1982, Gunawan was installed as the inaugural dean of the University of Indonesia's postgraduate faculty. He was re-appointed for a second term in April 1986 and served until 1989.

Aside from his permanent posts, Wardhana also held a number of ad-hoc committees in the faculty. He was a member of the faculty's curriculum development committee from 1961 to 1962, the faculty's library committee from 1968 to 1970, and a dissertation proposal assessor from 1978 to 1980. He was part of the editorial board of the Indonesian Management and Businessman magazine and the Journal of American Studies.

Aside from his work at the University of Indonesia, Wardhana was also responsible for the development of economic faculties in various universities in Indonesia, such as the Andalas University, Hasanuddin University, and the Syiah Kuala University. Wardhana was involved in drafting the law on companies by the Minister of State for Economic, Financial and Industrial Affairs, the national education bill by the Department of Education and Culture, and government regulations by the Directorate General of Higher Education.

== Personal life ==
Wardhana was married to Anna Wardhana. He died on 14 September 1991 after succumbing to his illness. His funeral, held three days after his death, was attended by nearly all ministers, former ministers, and professors from the University of Indonesia.

Wardhana was a member of the Indonesian Christian Church Synod and chaired the Tirtamarta Education Foundation, which managed schools under the church.
