= Budi Gunadi Sadikin =

Indonesian politician (born 1964)

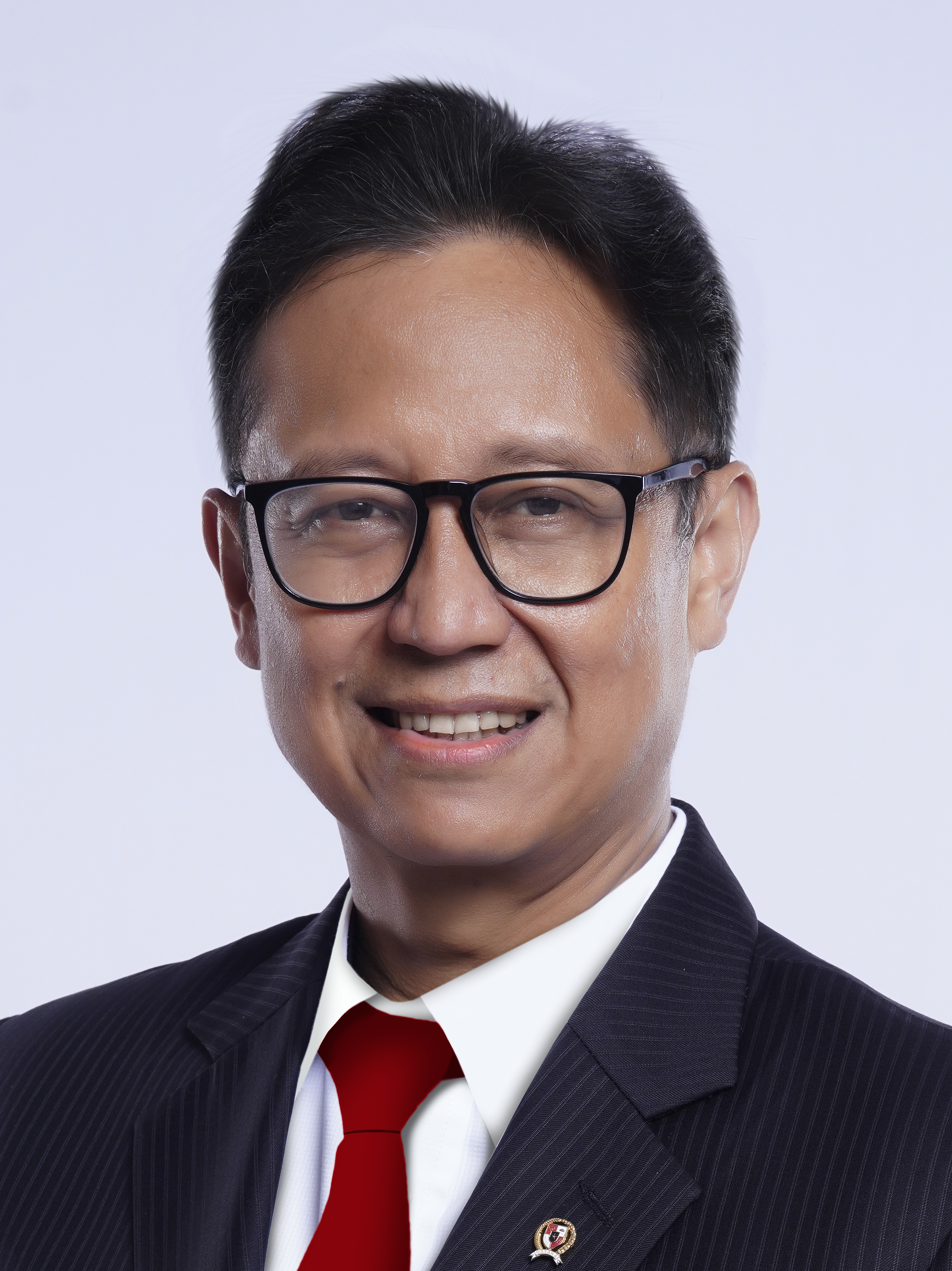

20th Minister of Health
- Incumbent
- Assumed office 23 December 2020
- President: Joko Widodo; Prabowo Subianto
- Deputy: Dante Saksono Harbuwono (2024–present); Benjamin Paulus Octavianus (2025–present)
- Preceded by: Terawan Agus Putranto

2nd Deputy Minister of State-Owned Enterprises
- In office 25 October 2019 – 23 December 2020 Serving with Kartika Wirjoatmodjo
- President: Joko Widodo; Prabowo Subianto
- Minister: Erick Thohir
- Preceded by: Mahmuddin Yasin
- Succeeded by: Pahala Mansury

Personal details
- Born: Budi Gunadi Sadikin; 6 May 1964 (age 62) Bandung, West Java, Indonesia
- Party: independent
- Spouse: Ida Rachmawati
- Children: Reza Abdurahman; Nabila Raihana; Sabila Maharani
- Education: Bandung Institute of Technology; (BSc)
- Occupation: Bureaucrat; banker

Budi Gunadi Sadikin (born 6 May 1964) is an Indonesian politician. He currently serves as Minister of Health since 2020. He is only the second Health Minister not to graduate from a medical school, and the first since Mananti Sitompul.

== Early life and education ==
In 1988, he earned a Bachelor of Science in Engineering Physics from the Bandung Institute of Technology.

== Professional career ==
Budi started his career as IT staff at IBM Asia Pacific in Tokyo from 1988 until 1994. Then, he became a banker as General Manager of Electronic Banking - Chief GM Jakarta - Chief GM HR PT Bank Bali Tbk (1994–1999), and Senior VP Consumer and Commercial Banking ABN Amro Bank Indonesia & Malaysia (1999–2004).

He also served as Executive VP Consumer Banking Bank Danamon (2004–2006), Director of Micro and Retail Banking Bank Mandiri (2006–2013), and President Director of PT Bank Mandiri Tbk (2013–2016).

Starting in 2016, Budi began to enter the government as Special Staff to the Minister of State Owned Enterprises (2016–2017).

In 2017, he was appointed as President Director of PT Inalum. In his era, Inalum bought 51 percent of PT Freeport Indonesia.

He was then appointed as Deputy Minister of State-Owned Enterprises I since November 2019.

== Political career ==
=== Health minister ===
During the COVID-19 pandemic, his office set up a special unit to deal with flagging oxygen supplies for medical use.

Political offices
Preceded by Terawan Agus Putranto	Minister of Health; 2020–present	Incumbent
Preceded by Mahmuddin Yasin	Deputy Minister of State-Owned Enterprises; 2019–2020; Served alongside: Kartika Wirjoatmodjo	Succeeded by Pahala Mansury
