= Tompaso =

Coordinates: 1°11′N 124°49′E

Tompaso is a highland district located about 45 km south-west of Manado in Minahasa Regency, North Sulawesi, Indonesia. It also refers to a sub-tribe as part of larger Tontemboan tribe in the Minahasa ethnic group.

== Historical value ==
According to history, Tompaso is believed to be the origin of Minahasa people before they spread all over the land of Minahasa. One of its villages, Pinabetengan, inherited a megalithic stone about 4 m long and 2 m high tagged with full of carved pictures. The pictures portray some kind of lifetime covenant of how Minahasans were supposed to divide their territory and live peacefully.

== Information ==
- Location: see map
- Geographic coordinate: 1.11 N, 124.73 E
- Area: 30.2 km²
- Population: 13,672 (2003)
- Workforce: 8,736
- Growth: 4.81
- Density: 504 /km²

== Villages ==
- Tolok
- Pinabetengan
- Tonsewer
- Toure
- Kamanga
- Tember
- Liba
- Sendangan
- Talikuran
- Tompaso II
- Tempok

== Key places ==
- Mount Soputan, Toure Village
- 230 MW Geothermal Power Plant
- Adventist High School, Tompaso II Village
- Salvation Army Orphanage, Liba Village
- Maesa Tompaso Racecourse, Talikuran
