= Siti Fadilah Supari =

15th Health Minister of Indonesia

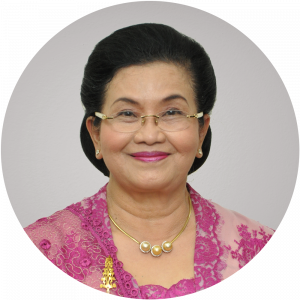

17th Health Minister of Indonesia
- In office 21 October 2004 – 20 October 2009
- President: Susilo Bambang Yudhoyono
- Preceded by: Achmad Sujudi
- Succeeded by: Endang Rahayu Sedyaningsih

Member of the Advisory Council of the President of Indonesia
- In office 25 January 2010 – 20 October 2014
- President: Susilo Bambang Yudhoyono

Personal details
- Born: 6 November 1949 (age 76) Surakarta, Central Java, Indonesia
- Party: non party
- Spouse: Muhammad Supari (deceased)
- Education: Gadjah Mada University; University of Indonesia
- Occupation: Cardiologist
- Profession: education lecturer

Siti Fadilah Supari (born 6 November 1949 in Surakarta, Central Java), is a cardiology research specialist, a former health minister of Indonesia. She gained global notoriety in 2007 when she took on the World Health Organization's practice of sharing avian influenza virus samples.

== Minister of Health ==
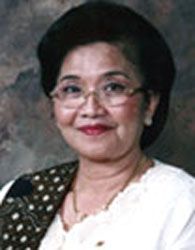
Supari as Minister of Health (2004)

Supari was appointed Minister of Health by President Susilo Bambang Yudhoyono on 20 August 2004. She served until 22 October 2009 when she was succeeded by Endang Rahayu Sedyaningsih, an epidemiologist and close advisor in her team.

=== Influenza debate and standoff with WHO ===
On 3 August 2006, Supari made the unprecedented move by announcing that the Indonesian government will make genomic data on bird flu viruses accessible to anyone. Supari said, opening up global access could be the key to unlocking such vital information as to the origin of the virus, how it causes disease, how it is mutating, the sources of infection, and how to prevent or cure the virus. "But in future cooperation on bird flu with other countries, the delivery of specimens should be regulated under Material Transfer Agreement documents as is commonly practised in scientific cooperation," Supari added. The Economist wrote, Supari started a revolution that could yet save the world from the ravages of a pandemic disease. That is because Indonesia's health minister has chosen a weapon that may prove more useful than today's best vaccines in tackling such emerging threats as avian flu: transparency.

It was unclear at the time what prompted Supari to share data, given the widespread reluctance of countries affected by the H5N1 virus to share their data, out of fear such disclosure could trigger economic sanctions. Just days before, an editorial published in Nature highlighted this problem with China's practice of belatedly publishing details of a case that tested positive for the virulent H5N1 strain in 2003 — contradicting the government's official line that none had occurred before November 2005. Although not mentioning Supari by name, the editorial also addressed a confirmation by the World Health Organization (WHO) that a cluster of eight cases in an extended family in Northern Sumatra was the first unequivocal occurrence of limited human-to-human transmission of the H5N1 virus.

On 22 August 2006, two weeks after Supari made her announcement, Nancy Cox, the director of the influenza division at the US Centers for Disease Control and Prevention (CDC) communicated in a press release that following Indonesia's announcement, it too made genomic data on bird flu viruses publicly accessible. The following day a correspondence letter appeared in Nature shedding light on what had triggered the sudden shift in Supari's stance and that of the CDC. The scientific community had just been introduced to Peter Bogner, the new driving force in the virus sharing debate.

Supari would later describe in her book an affinity for Peter Bogner, his plea to her government to share its bird flu virus data and his concern when she annoyed the US administration at times. Supari wrote, "he told me indirectly my speech had been too sharp," or "Peter Bogner has the capability to change the world's opinions." A former broadcast executive at Time Warner, he was not only familiar with intellectual property issues, but more importantly, he was friendly with Supari's government following his role in the 2004 Indian Ocean earthquake and tsunami relief efforts. He would turn out to be the mastermind behind the GISAID initiative, a mechanism devised and financed almost exclusively by him.

When Supari attended the 61st World Health Assembly on 16 May 2008, the day GISAID's database was launched, Supari made available genetic H5N1 data alongside other countries like China and Russia. Within four months, this publicly accessible resource offered the world's most comprehensive collection of influenza data.

Claiming Western governments could be developing viruses for dissemination in the developing world with the goal of generating business for pharmaceutical companies, Supari refused WHO researchers access to Indonesia's H5N1 bird flu virus samples in 2006. Indonesia resumed sending some H5N1 samples to WHO after a new agreement that developing nations would get access to vaccines.

=== 2009 flu pandemic ===
During a press conference on 28 April 2009, Supari reassured the public over the government's response to the swine flu threat and responded to a question on the origin of the H1N1 virus and whether it could have been man-made. Supari stated she was not sure whether the virus was genetically engineered, but it is a possibility. Several news outlets, among them Bloomberg News and the Times of India, reported about an investigation by the WHO into a claim by Australian researchers that the swine flu virus circling the globe may have been created as a result of human error. Australian virologists Adrian Gibbs, John Armstrong and Jean Downie suggested in a paper published in the Virology Journal, the new H1N1 strain, may be the product of three strains from three continents that swapped genes in a lab or a vaccine-making plant, suggesting its origin could be more simply explained by human involvement than a coincidence of nature.

On 12 May 2009, Supari expressed her dissatisfaction of seeing many foreign medical students in Indonesia. She asked Universitas Padjadjaran Rector, Bandung to cut down foreign student intake in phases especially from Malaysia while visiting Cicendo Eyes Hospital, Bandung.

Supari was instrumental in the termination of the United States Naval Medical Research Unit Two presence in Jakarta, and NAMRU-2 departed Indonesia in 2010.

== Personal life ==
Supari is a cardiology research specialist based in Jakarta. Supari was married for 36 years to Muhammad Supari until his death in March 2009.

== Corruption conviction ==
On 16 June 2017, Supari was convicted of corruption and sentenced to four years in jail. The Jakarta Corruption Court found she had accepted bribes related to the procurement of medical equipment for the Health Ministry's crisis centre in 2005. She was fined IDR 200 million (US$15,042), although her actions had caused IDR 6.15 billion in state losses. The court ruled she had abused her authority as a minister by accepting bribes of IDR 3.2 billion from two directors of PT Graha Ismaya in the form of traveller's checks. She was ordered to return IDR 550 million to the state after previously returning IDR 1.35 billion. Her former subordinate Rustam Pakaya was also sentenced to four years in jail over a 2007 procurement corruption case that caused IDR 21.3 billion in state losses.

== Books ==
- It's time for the world to change - In the spirit of dignity, equity and transparency - Divine hand behind avian influenza, ISBN 978-979-17357-0-4

Political offices
Preceded by Achmad Sujudi	Minister of Health; 20 August 2004 – 22 October 2009	Succeeded by Endang Rahayu Sedyaningsih
