= Nila Moeloek =

Indonesian politician (born 1949)

18th Health Minister of Indonesia
- In office 27 October 2014 – 20 October 2019
- President: Joko Widodo
- Preceded by: Nafsiah Mboi
- Succeeded by: Terawan Agus Putranto

Personal details
- Born: 11 April 1949 (age 77) Jakarta, Indonesia
- Spouse: Farid Anfasa Moeloek
- Children: 3
- Education: University of Indonesia

Nila Djuwita Farid Moeloek (born 11 April 1949) is an Indonesian politician and physician. She was the Minister of Health of the Republic of Indonesia from 27 October 2014 until 20 October 2019. She is an ophthalmologist and lecturer in the Faculty of Medicine, University of Indonesia.

== Career ==
Moeloek has participated in the selection for the Minister of Health on 18 October 2009, but instead she was appointed as the Representative of Indonesia to Millennium Development Goals (MDGs) by President Susilo Bambang Yudhoyono.

Political offices
Preceded by Nafsiah Mboi	Health Minister of Indonesia; 2014–2019	Succeeded by Terawan Agus Putranto
