= Tutty Alawiyah =

Indonesian politician

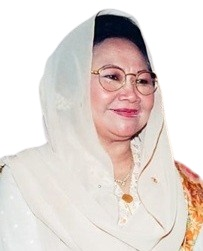
Tuti Alawiyah (1998)

Tutty Alawiyah (30 March 1942 – 4 May 2016), sometimes spelled Tuty Alawiyah, was an Indonesian politician and women's rights advocate. She served as Minister of State for Women's Affairs from March 1998 to October 1999 during the administrations of both President Suharto and his successor, President B. J. Habibie.

Alawiyah, the daughter of an Islamic scholar named Abdullah Syaffi'ie, was born in Jakarta on 30 March 1942. She graduated from Syarif Hidayatullah State Islamic University Jakarta, which had previously been known as Syarif Hidayatullah State Islamic Institute.

In March 1998, Tutty Alawiyah was appointed Minister of State for Women's Affairs during the waning days of the Suharto administration. She continued to serve as Minister for Women's Affairs under Suharto's successor, President B. J. Habibie until October 1999.

Alawiyah was the former President of the International Women’s Union, which has branches in approximately eighty countries. She was also an executive member of the Indonesian Ulema Council (MUI) and the Muslim Intellectuals Association (ICMI).

She later founded and served as the rector of Assyafiiyah Islamic University in Pondok Gede, Bekasi, West Java, a position she held until her death in May 2016.

Tutty Alawiyah died at Metropolitan Medical Center (MMC) in Kuningan, Jakarta, at 7.15 a.m. on 4 May 2016, following a two-week hospitalization. Alawiyah was 74 years old.

== See also ==
- List of female cabinet ministers of Indonesia
