= Nafsiah Mboi =

17th Health Minister of Indonesia

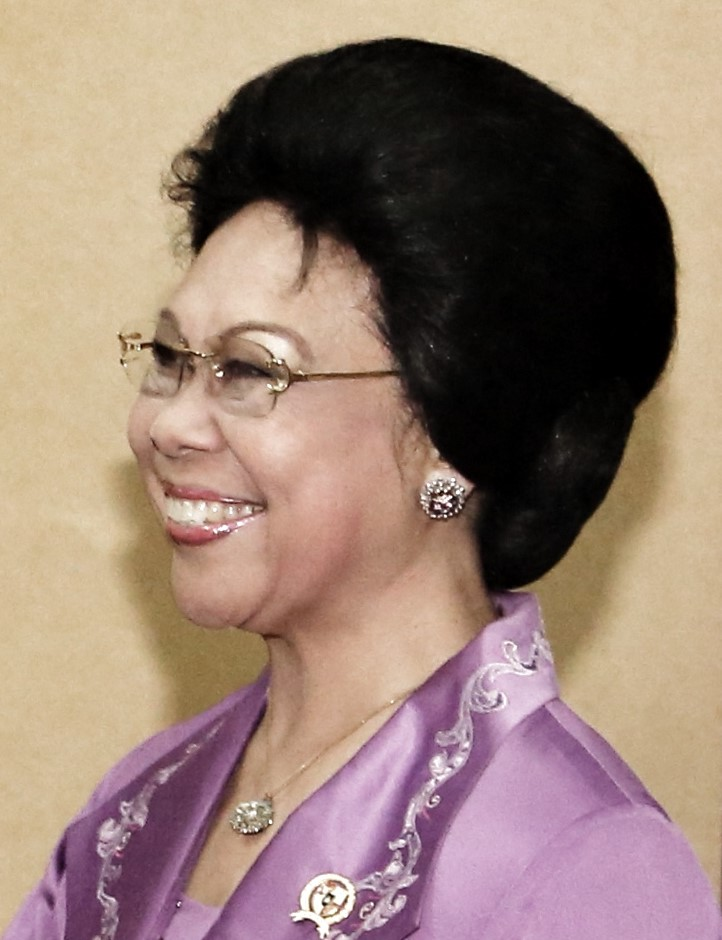
- Mboi in 2014

17th Health Minister of Indonesia
- In office 14 June 2012 – 20 October 2014
- President: Susilo Bambang Yudhoyono
- Preceded by: Endang Rahayu Sedyaningsih
- Succeeded by: Nila Moeloek

Personal details
- Born: 14 July 1941 (age 85) Sengkang, South Sulawesi, Dutch East Indies
- Spouse: Aloysius Benedictus Mboi
- Children: Maria Yosefina Tridia Mboi; Gerardus Majela Mboi; Henri Dunant Mboi
- Parent(s): Andi Walinono; Rahmatiah Sonda Daeng Badji
- Education: University of Indonesia; Institute of Tropical Medicine Antwerp

Andi Nafsiah Walinono Mboi (born 14 July 1941) is an Indonesian politician and physician. She served as Minister of Health of the Republic of Indonesia from 14 June 2012 until 20 October 2014. Dr Mboi currently serves as the Leaders' Envoy for the Asia Pacific Leaders Malaria Alliance (APLMA).

== Career ==
Nafsiah Mboi is a veteran senior pediatrician who received a Master of Public Health qualification from the Institute of Tropical Medicine Antwerp, Belgium in 1990 and became a research fellow for Takemi Program in International Health at Harvard University, Cambridge, United States in 1990–1991. Her involvement in the health sector began in 1978, when she along with her husband, Aloysius Benedictus Mboi who served as Governor of East Nusa Tenggara were doing their efforts in elevating the health and welfare of the people of East Nusa Tenggara.

She is known to have a high concern in the field of HIV/AIDS advocacy. Mboi also pioneered the establishment of the Sentani Commitment in 2004 which became a milestone commitment of the governments for AIDS prevention. She is also known to be actively involved in the field of human rights and was the head of children's rights committee for the United Nations. In government, he was a member of the People's Consultative Assembly in 1982–1987. Since 2006, Nafsiah served as Executive Secretary of the National AIDS Commission and vice chairman of the National Commission for Women.

On 13 June 2012, Mboi was appointed as the Minister of Health by President Susilo Bambang Yudhoyono after the previous minister, Endang Rahayu Sedyaningsih died on 2 May 2012, from lung cancer. With her appointment, this ministry continues consecutive held by women ministers, having previously held by Supari and Endang Rahayu Sedyaningsih. Mboi is the Minister of Health with the oldest age who had served, by the age of 71 years.

Political offices
Preceded by Endang Rahayu Sedyaningsih	Minister of Health; 14 June 2012 – 20 October 2014	Succeeded by Nila Moeloek
