= Asia Pacific Leaders Malaria Alliance =

Asia Pacific Leaders Malaria Alliance (APLMA) is an affiliation of Asian and Pacific heads of government formed to accelerate progress against malaria, aiming to eliminate the disease in the Asia Pacific Region by 2030 and reduce the risk of other communicable diseases.

The need to engage and support leaders and finance ministers led to the creation of APLMA, using the East Asia Summit process to galvanize heads of government. APLMA also presents a platform from which to use malaria as an entry point for broader strategic dialogue on health systems and security.

== History ==
APLMA and its secretariat were created at the 2013 Brunei East Asia Summit (EAS) in response to leaders' growing concerns about the risk of a malaria resurgence, following a Declaration on Regional Responses to Malaria Control and Addressing Resistance to Antimalarial Medication meeting of the EAS in 2012. The APLMA Secretariat formally commenced operations in January 2014 and is currently based in Singapore.

The APLMA Mission is to support and facilitate elimination of malaria across Asia Pacific by 2030: Driving implementation of the APLMA Leaders Malaria Elimination Roadmap by benchmarking progress against priorities, coordinating regional action and brokering policy, technical and financing solutions to regional and national challenges and bolstering country leadership to expedite elimination of malaria at country level by 2030.
