= Gatot Soebroto Army Hospital =

- Indonesian Army Health Center

Geography
- Location: Jalan Abdul Rahman Saleh, Senen, Central Jakarta, Jakarta, Indonesia
- Coordinates: 6.176678°S 106.83687°E

Organisation
- Type: Army hospital

Services
- Emergency department: Yes (24 hours)

History
- Opened: 1819; 207 years ago

Links
- Website: https://www.rspadgs.net/en
- Lists: Hospitals in Indonesia

Gatot Soebroto Central Army Hospital (Indonesian: Rumah Sakit Pusat Angkatan Darat Gatot Soebroto, abbreviated as RSPAD Gatot Soebroto) is a military hospital in Jakarta, Indonesia. The name of the hospital is derived from Gatot Soebroto, a National Hero of Indonesia. Established in 1819, the hospital is the main hospital for the Indonesian Army. The hospital also provides limited services for civilians.

== History ==
=== Dutch Colonial period ===
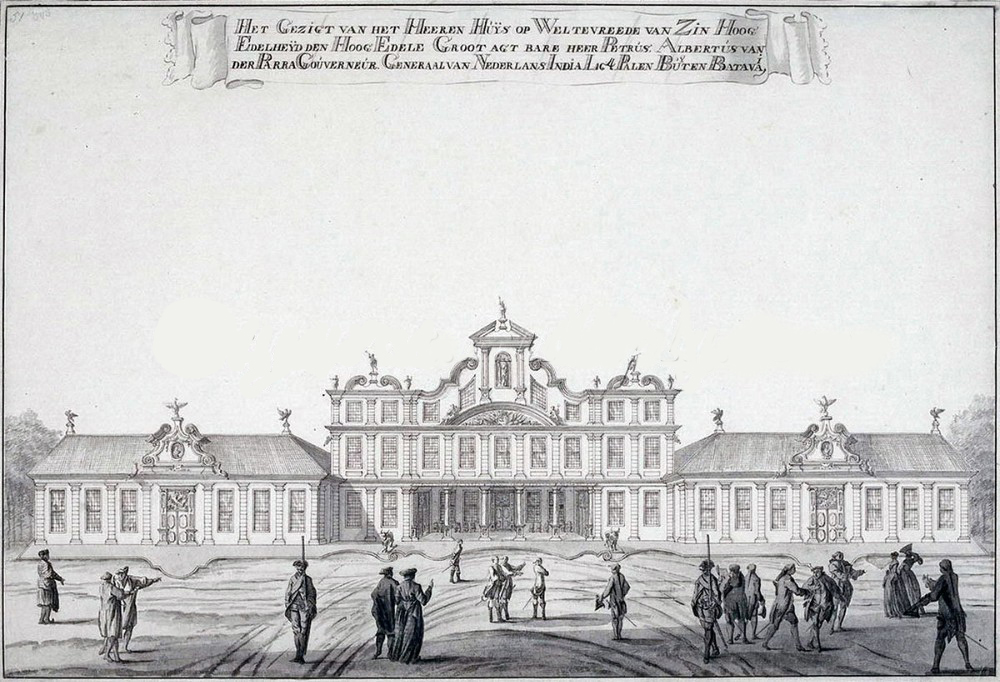
The Weltevreden country house, house of the governor-general of the Dutch East Indies, stands where the hospital now stand. It was demolished in 1820.

The location of the hospital was formerly the country house of Governor-General Van der Parra until 1820.

When Louis Bonaparte appointed Daendels as Governor General of the Dutch East Indies in 1807, his main task is to strengthen the defense of Java to protect it from the British Army. He arrived on Java in 1808 and led the colonial government with a militaristic leadership that he gain the title IJzeren Maarschalk, the "Iron Marshal". Among his achievements is the establishment of the Military Health Service (Dutch: Militaire Geneeskundige Dienst) and three military hospitals each in Jakarta, Semarang, and Surabaya. He also built garrison hospitals in or near military barracks. He was helped by J. Heppener, one of the student of Brugmans, a leading military physician who introduced the importance of cleanliness and hygiene in the Military Health Service. These hospitals were built according to Brugmans' principle: spacious, well-ventilated building, and frequently sanitized facility. In 1811, after Daendels' return to the Netherlands, Java was invaded by the British army on September, and Raffles was appointed Lieutenant Governor of Java. The British colonial period of Java happened until 1816.

The former hospital of VOC, the external hospital (Dutch: buiten hospitaal), which located in what is now Istiqlal Mosque, was the first Groot Militair Hospitaal in Batavia. There were also the Militair Hospitaal Meester Cornelis and Militair Hospitaal Weltevreden (not at the same location with the current Gatot Subroto Army Hospital) which were built in barracks and headed by a non-commissioned officer as managemeester, so in that sense not a true hospital. The number of bed in this hospital was increased from 222 to 400 in 1819.

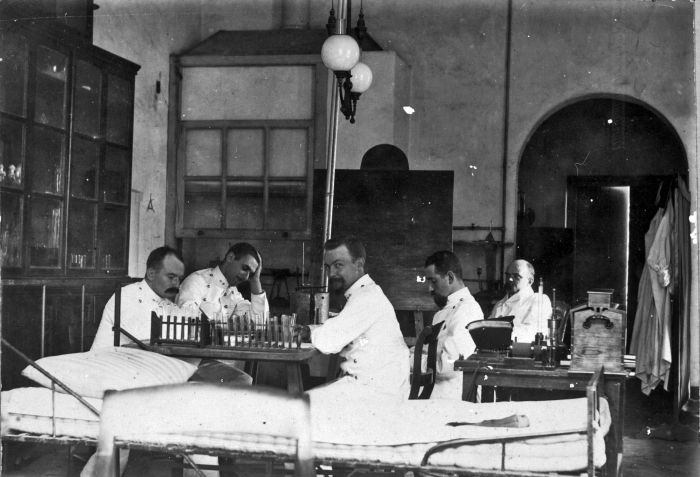
Dutch officers in the Groot Militair Hospitaal of Weltevreden.

In 1825 the number of bed was not sufficient any longer due to the increasing number of treated military members as a result of many struggles for independence in various area of Indonesia (Maluku war, Palembang war, Bone, Padri War, Java War, and so on). A change in the policy of the Cabinet of the Governor-General had made it necessary to move the Groot Militair Hospitaal into a new location which is the current location of the RSPAD Gatot Subroto. The new Groot Militair Hospital Weltevreden contains larger facility than the previous hospitals:

- Six wards, each of 837 feet long.
- Ward for psychiatric patients.
- Ward for officers, each of 112 feet long, linked with a building for office and guards.
- A pharmacy and a residence for the pharmacist
- A bathhouse and a residence for badmeester
- A morgue
- A kitchen and a residence for the chef
- A clothing storage, a porter house and its guard house.
- Stable

Construction of the hospital was slow and assumed to be completed in October 1836. In this new hospital, the practice of modern medicine was started. In this hospital in 1896, Eijkman discovered the cause of beriberi, a disease of the peripheral nerves, which won him a Nobel Prize for Medicine. The military hospital also started the education for the native Javanese doctors, which pioneered the establishment of STOVIA.

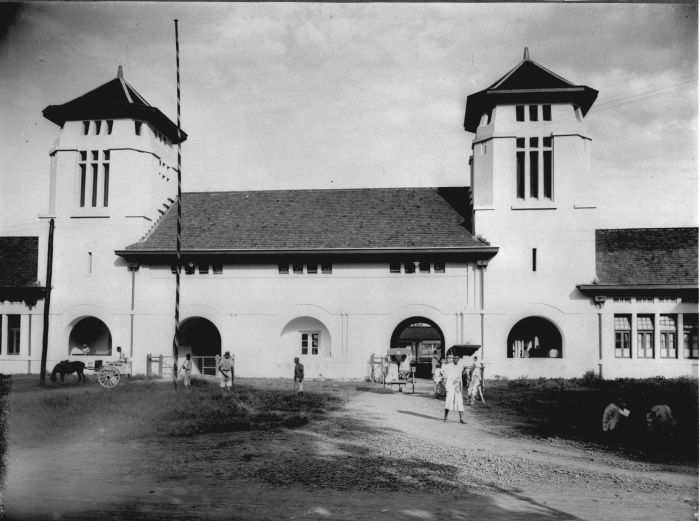
The CBZ

The militarization of the medicine service occurred for almost a century. In 1911, a civil health service was founded and in 1919, the Centrale Burgelijke Ziekeninrichting (CBZ), the Central Civil Hospital of Batavia, was established (the hospital is now the Cipto Mangunkusumo Hospital). The old building of the military hospital that is still preserved is currently used as a pharmacy for the RSPAD Gatot Subroto.

=== Independence period ===
After the Netherlands' recognition of Indonesia's independence on 29 December 1949, one of the Dutch military medical installation called Leger Hospital Batavia was handed over to the Indonesian National Army. The official handover occurred on 26 July 1950 between the Indonesian National Army Lieutenant Colonel Dr. Satrio and KNIL Lieutenant Colonel Dr. Scheffers. The hospital was renamed as Rumah Sakit Tentara Pusat ("Central Army Hospital"), abbreviated as RSTP. RSTP was under the management of Djawatan Kesehatan Tentara Angkatan Darat ("Army's Department of Health"). When the department shortened its name to Djawatan Kesehatan Angkatan Darat, the hospital automatically renamed itself into Rumah Sakit Pusat Angkatan Darat, officially abbreviated as RUMKIT PUS-AD, but more popularly known as RSPAD.

Colonel Doctor Suselo Wirjosaputro was the first TNI doctor who enters the military hospital (January 1950). He was given the task to prepare the handing over of the hospital from the Dutch army to the Indonesian national army, following the recognition of Indonesia' independence in the Round Table Conference on 29 December 1949. The conference also decided to transfer various military installations in Indonesia, among others Militaire Dienst Geneeskundige Oost Java (now Kesdam V UB) and Hospitaal Militaire in Malang (now Soepraoen Hospital) in April 1950. At that time, the hospital was headed by Colonel Doctor Van Bommel with 60 doctors (including 10 specialists), 300 Dutch nurses and 300 auxiliary nurses of Indonesian nationals and other workers e.g. kitchen staff, laundry, gardeners and other support personnel. One of the Dutch specialists that turns out to be able to work longer in this hospital is Borgers, a surgeon.

Suselo brought new staffs for the hospital. The team was initially housed in the guestroom of female dormitory (currently in RSPAD Gatot Soebroto's medical rehab unit), later moved to the 2nd floor department of obstetrics (now used for academy of midwifery). The preparation went well at first, but later there were frequent issues between both parties. Therefore, the chairman of the Indonesian Department of Health appointed Doctor Satrio to replace Suselo to prepare the handing over.

The ceremony of the handing over of the Militaire Geneeskundige Dienst (Leger Hospitaal Batavia) occurred on 26 July 1950. The Dutch history and tradition of the hospital ended after 114 years (1836 - 1950).

The hospital was then converted into Rumah Sakit Tentara Pusat (RSTP) or "Central Army Hospital", managed by the Department of Medicine of the Central Army. Satrio, head of the RSTP, stayed in his official residence at Jalan Lapangan Banteng Barat No. 32, former house of surgeon Doctor Borgers (on this location now stands the office of the Indonesian Department of Religion).

=== Old Order period (1950-1966) ===
As the new head of the hospital, Satrio made sure the existing Dutch nurses were not treated discriminatively. Several Indonesian doctors from the Central General Hospital, as well as new Indonesian graduates, were transferred to the Military Hospital. A nurse school was established in 1951, now the Academy of Nursing and Midwifery.

On 1 March 1952, Satrio gave his position to the new head of the Military Hospital Reksodiwirjo Wijotoardjo. Due to the political and economic condition at the time, not much improvements were done for the hospital. At this time the hospital name was changed from Rumah Sakit Tentara Pusat to Rumah Sakit Pusat Angkatan Darat ("Army Central Hospital").

In 1957, Gatot Soebroto, at the time served as Deputy Chief of Staff of the Army, built workshop facilities for orthopedics, physiotherapy, basketball court, and a dorm. He also moved the existing orthopedic workshops from Dustira Military Hospital, Bandung. This workshop is now a room for psychiatric. Because of his attention to the Army Hospital, Subroto's name was immortalized into the current name of the hospital.

=== New Order period (1966-1998) ===
During this period many improvements were made for the hospital. A pavilion where Sukarno was treated (1967), delivery room (1968, now demolished and converted into a parking lot), and a childcare facility (1972). Medical equipments were updated. The 6 floors general care unit was inaugurated in 1974 by Soeharto, the president of Indonesia at that time. The 6 floors surgical unit and the 8 floors nurse dormitory (popularly known as Asrama 16) were inaugurated in 1976. Supporting units e.g. food storage, laundry room, and kitchen unit were inaugurated in 1977. Pathological unit, radiology unit, intensive care unit, renal unit, a helipad, a mosque, and flats for doctor were inaugurated between the period of 1979–1992.

On 22 October 1970, under decision letter number SKEP-582/X/1970, the name was changed to Rumah Sakit Gatot Soebroto ("Gatot Soebroto Hospital") to honor Gatot Soebroto, the former deputy chief of staff of the army. On 4 August 1977, the hospital was renamed as Rumah Sakit Pusat Angkatan Darat (RSPAD) Gatot Soebroto as part of having uniform title names for RSPAD-operated hospitals.

== Notable deaths ==
Notable Indonesian people that died in this hospital includes:

Name	Date of death	Known for	Resting place
Friedrich Silaban	14 May 1984	Architect of Gelora Bung Karno Sports Complex and Istiqlal Mosque	Cipaku Public Cemetery, Bogor City
B. J. Habibie	11 September 2019	Third President of Indonesia	Kalibata Heroes' Cemetery, South Jakarta
