= Endang Rahayu Sedyaningsih =

16th Health Minister of Indonesia

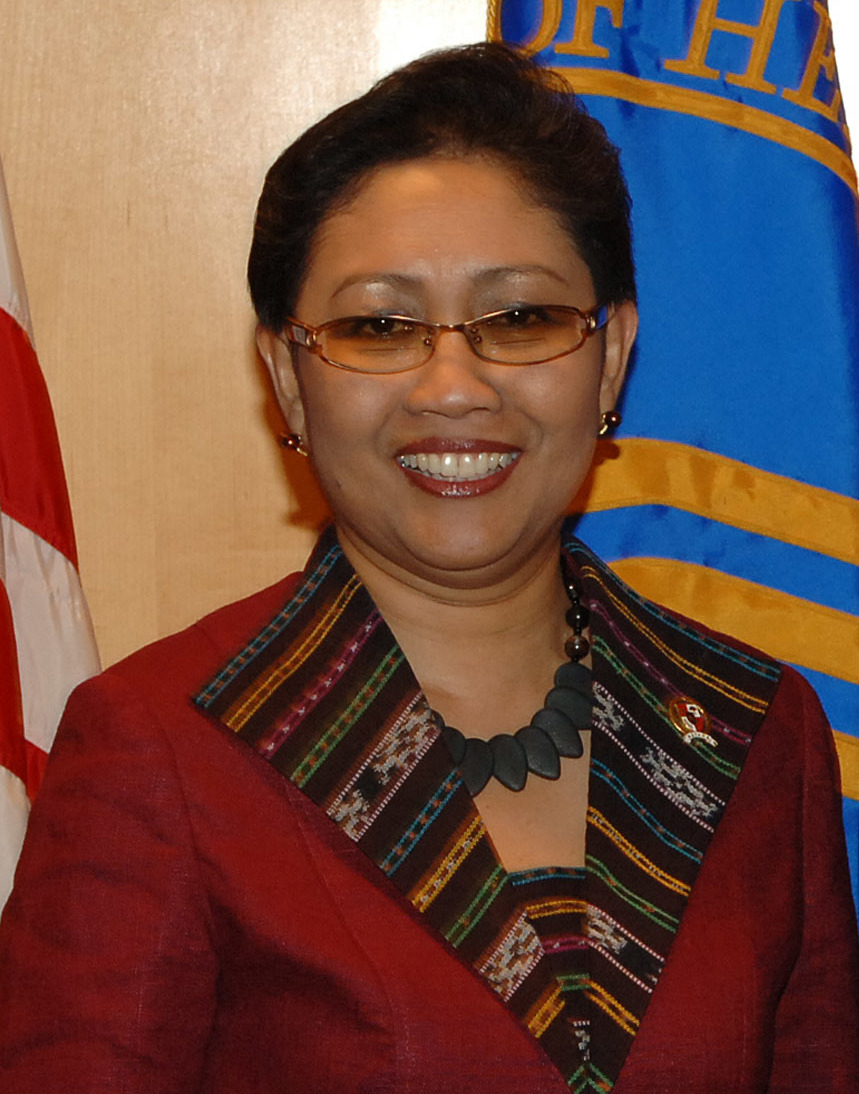

16th Health Minister of Indonesia
- In office 22 October 2009 – 30 April 2012
- President: Susilo Bambang Yudhoyono
- Preceded by: Siti Fadillah Supari
- Succeeded by: Nafsiah Mboi

Personal details
- Born: 1 February 1955 Jakarta, Indonesia
- Died: 2 May 2012 (aged 57) Jakarta, Indonesia
- Spouse(s): Dr. Reanny Mamahit, SpOG, MM
- Children: Arinanda Wailan Mamahit; Awandha Raspati Mamahit; Rayinda Raumanen Mamahit
- Education: University of Indonesia; Harvard School of Public Health
- Profession: Physician; Researcher; Author

Endang Rahayu Sedyaningsih (1 February 1955 – 2 May 2012) was an Indonesian physician, researcher, and author. She served as Minister of Health of the Republic of Indonesia from 22 October 2009 until 30 April 2012.

== Career ==
Endang began her career in 1979 as a clinician in the Jakarta Pertamina Hospital. She joined the public health service in 1980 and worked in remote areas as the Head of Waipare Health Center in East Nusa Tenggara for three years. In 1983, she moved to Jakarta and continued working in the public health service with the Jakarta Provincial Health Office. In 1997, she joined the National Institute of Health Research and Development (NIHRD) of the Indonesian Ministry of Health.

=== Research work ===
Endang worked as a researcher in the Center of Disease Control Research and Program Development, NIHRD for more than a decade. For 6 months in 2001, she spent her time working at the World Health Organization Headquarters in Geneva, Switzerland. From 1997 to 2006, Endang held an important position at the World Health Organization’s headquarters in Geneva, as a technical adviser in the department of communicable disease surveillance and response. She was appointed as the Director of the Center of Biomedical Research and Program Development, NIHRD in 2007. Endang was given notable credit by her fellow researchers for her courage in having helped devise the GISAID sharing mechanism, playing a constructive role in global health.

=== Minister of Health ===
On 22 October 2009, Endang was appointed as the Minister of Health of the Republic of Indonesia by President Susilo Bambang Yudhoyono and joined his cabinet which is called the Second Unified Indonesia Cabinet. She succeeded her former supporter and boss Siti Fadillah Supari who had initially expressed her disappointment over the Endang's appointment as her replacement.

== Illness and death ==
In October 2010 she was diagnosed with lung cancer and underwent extensive treatment. On 20 April 2012, she was admitted to Cipto Mangunkusumo Hospital (Rumah Sakit Cipto Mangunkusumo, RSCM) due to continuous pain. On 26 April 2012, when President Susilo Bambang Yudhoyono visited her in the hospital, she tendered her resignation as Minister of Health due to ill-health. On 30 April 2012, Keputusan Presiden (Presidential Decree) No. 46/P/2012 was signed by President Yudhoyono, ending Endang's term as Indonesia's Minister of Health.

Endang died at the age of 57 on 2 May 2012 in RSCM, Jakarta. President Susilo Bambang Yudhoyono presided over her state funeral the next day at the Heroes Plaza, San Diego Hills Memorial Park, Karawang, West Java.

== Education ==
Endang grew up in Jakarta and went to a public elementary school, later on called as SD Negeri Merdeka Timur. She then continued her education to SMP Negeri 35 and SMA Negeri 4 in Jalan Batu. Endang received her medical degree in 1979 from the Faculty of Medicine at the University of Indonesia, and her Master of Public Health (MPH) and Doctor of Public Health (DrPH) degrees in Social Epidemiology from Harvard School of Public Health in 1997.

== Personal life ==
Endang was the oldest daughter of Sudjiran Resosudarmo and Satimah Mardjana. Endang was married to Dr. Reanny Mamahit, an obstetrics and gynaecology specialist and Director of RSUD Tangerang (Tangerang Region Public Hospital). The couple had two sons and a daughter.

Political offices
Preceded by Siti Fadillah Supari	Minister of Health; 22 October 2009 - 30 April 2012	Succeeded by Nafsiah Mboi
