= Ministry of Health (Indonesia) =

Government ministry of Indonesia

- Kementerian Kesehatan
- Logo of the Ministry of Health

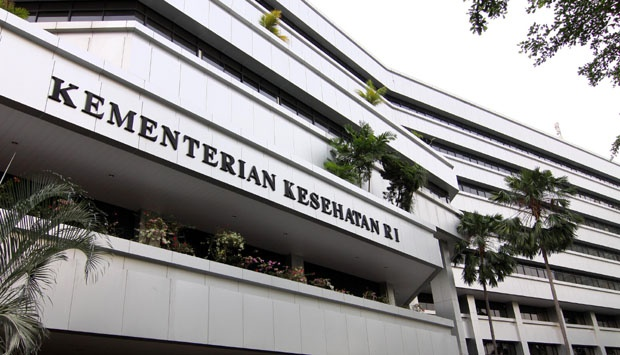
- Ministry of Health headquarters

Ministry overview
- Formed: 19 August 1945; 81 years ago
- Jurisdiction: Government of Indonesia
- Headquarters: Jalan H.R. Rasuna Said Blok X.5 Kav. 4-9 Jakarta Selatan 12950 Jakarta, Indonesia
- Minister responsible: Budi Gunadi Sadikin, Minister of Health
- Deputy Minister responsible: Dante Saksono Harbuwono, Deputy Minister of Health
- Website: kemkes.go.id

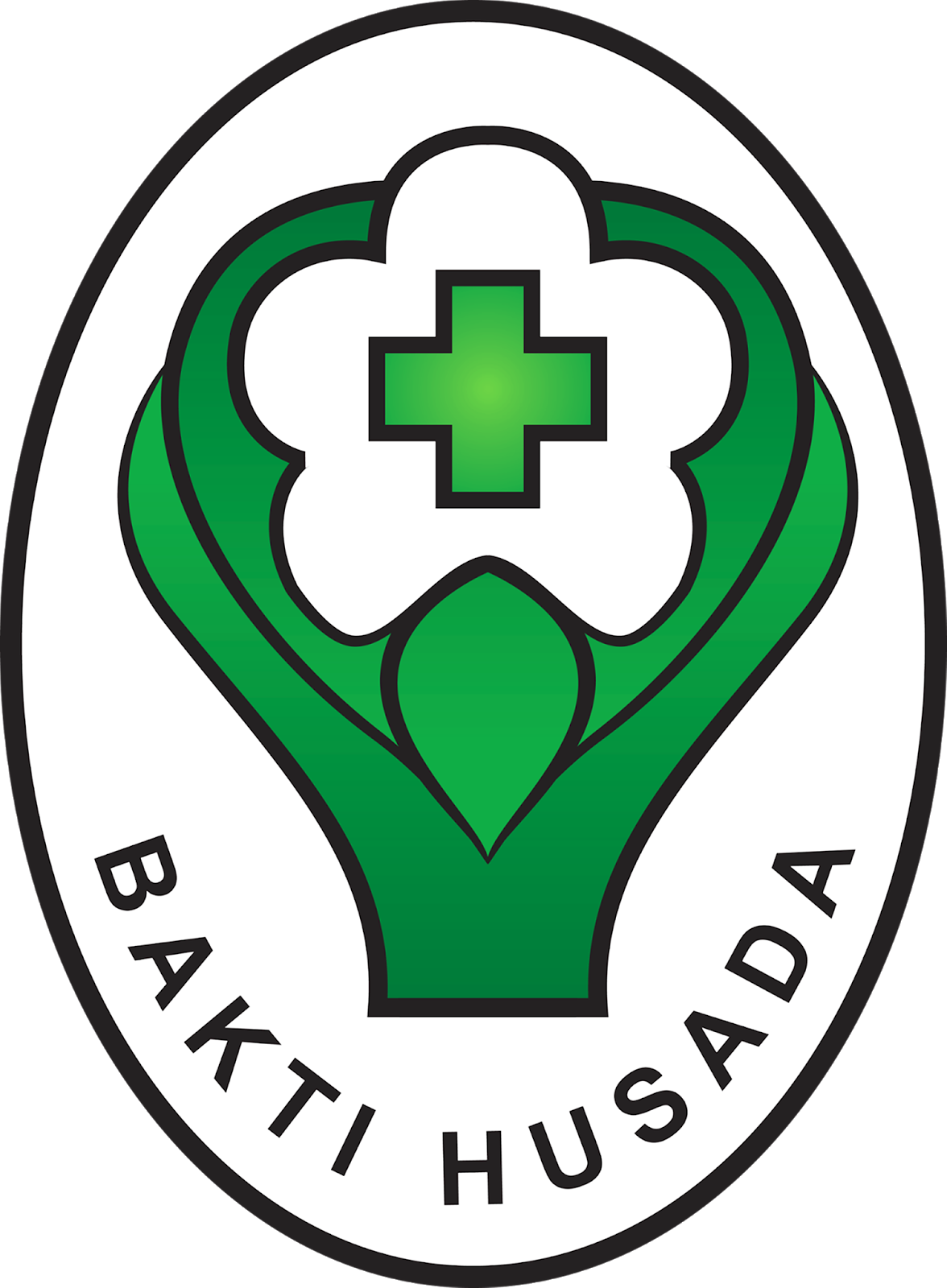
Former logo of the Ministry of Health, used from 2 November 1984 until 14 November 2016

The Ministry of Health (Indonesian: Kementerian Kesehatan, officially abbreviated as Kemenkes) is a government ministry which organize public health affairs within the Indonesian government.

== History ==
Ministry of Health was formed on 19 August 1945. The ministry is responsible for public health affairs in Indonesia. The ministry is led by a minister who is responsible to the president and part of the cabinet. Commonly, the minister usually came from medical doctor, however some of them were military doctor. Since 2009, the government has been required to allocate 5% of state budget for health sector. However, the mandatory 5% state budget for health sector was achieved in 2019.

In 2001, the ministry was merged with Department of Social Affairs (Indonesian: Departemen Sosial) into Department of Health and Social Welfare, however the merger was short-lived and both departments were reestablished. On 27 November 2001, Board for Development and Empowerment of Human Resources for Health (Indonesian: Badan Pengembangan dan Pemberdayaan Sumber Daya Manusia Kesehatan) was established.

Government Regulation through President No. 47/2009 concerning the Establishment and Organization of State Ministries issued on November 3 2009, changed all forms of Departments, Offices of State Ministers and Offices of the Coordinating Minister into State Ministries, therefore the nomenclature of the Department of Health (Indonesian: Departemen Kesehatan) was renamed into Ministry of Health.

On 23 September 2021, National Institute of Health Research and Development (NIHRD) will be transformed into Agency for Health Policies Development, a regulatory agency intended to provide only policies and standards making for state health activity, no longer doing research as the research part will be relinquished to National Research and Innovation Agency. Thus, on 7 November 2021, the Ministry issued order to NIHRD and its child agencies to halt their activities per 31 December 2021 as unit under auspices of Ministry of Health, effectively started the dismantlement of Balitbangkes. In the order, NIHRD will split into three parts: one part (which is the most) relinquished to BRIN, one part to become BKPK, and the rest of the Balitbangkes part in regional level will be relinquished to local government where the NIHRD branch formerly existed for being transformed into local-government run public health laboratories for being integrated as part of state public health laboratories system.

== List of Ministers ==
Parkindo PIR IPKI Military PSII SKI Golkar Independent
No.	Portrait	Name	Affiliation	Cabinet	Took office	Left office	Notes
1		Boentaran Martoatmodjo	Independent	Presidential	19 August 1945	14 November 1945	[A]
2		Darma Setiawan	Independent	Sjahrir I	14 November 1945	12 March 1946	[11]
2		Darma Setiawan	Independent	Sjahrir II	12 March 1946	2 October 1946	
2		Darma Setiawan	Independent	Sjahrir III	2 October 1946	26 June 1947	
3		Johannes Leimena	Parkindo	Amir Sjarifuddin I	3 July 1947	11 November 1947	[12]
3		Johannes Leimena	Parkindo	Amir Sjarifuddin II	11 November 1947	29 January 1948	
3		Johannes Leimena	Parkindo	Hatta I	29 January 1948	4 August 1949	
-		Mananti Sitompul	Parkindo	Emergency	19 December 1948	14 March 1949	[1]
-		Soekiman Wirjosandjojo	Masyumi	Emergency	14 March 1949	13 July 1949	[10]
-		Surono (ad-interim)	Independent	Hatta II	4 August 1949	1 December 1949	[10]
(3)		Johannes Leimena	Parkindo	Hatta II	4 August 1949	1 December 1949	
(3)		Johannes Leimena	Parkindo	R. I. S.	20 December 1949	6 September 1950	
4		Sutopo	PIR	Halim	21 January 1950	6 September 1950	
(3)		Johannes Leimena	Parkindo	Natsir	6 September 1950	27 April 1951	
(3)		Johannes Leimena	Parkindo	Sukiman	27 April 1951	23 February 1952	
(3)		Johannes Leimena	Parkindo	Wilopo	3 April 1952	3 June 1953	
-		Ferdinand Lumban Tobing (ad-interim)	SKI	Ali Sastroamidjojo I	1 August 1953	9 October 1953	
5		Lie Kiat Teng	PSII	Ali Sastroamidjojo I	9 October 1953	24 July 1955	
6		Hadrianus Sinaga	Parkindo	Ali Sastroamidjojo II	24 March 1956	14 March 1957	
7		Abdul Azis Saleh	IPKI	Djuanda	9 April 1957	6 July 1959	
–	Holding Junior Minister status			Working I	10 July 1959	18 February 1960	
8		Satrio	Military	Working II	18 February 1960	6 March 1962	
8		Satrio	Military	Working III	6 March 1962	13 November 1963	
8		Satrio	Military	Working IV	13 November 1963	27 August 1964	
8		Satrio	Military	Dwikora I	27 August 1964	22 February 1966	
8		Satrio	Military	Dwikora II	24 February 1966	28 March 1966	
8		Satrio	Military	Dwikora III	31 March 1966	25 July 1966	
9		G. A. Siwabessy	Independent	Ampera I	28 July 1966	17 October 1967	
9		G. A. Siwabessy	Independent	Ampera II	17 October 1967	6 June 1968	
9		G. A. Siwabessy	Independent	Development I	6 June 1968	28 March 1973	
9		G. A. Siwabessy	Independent	Development II	28 March 1973	29 March 1978	
10		Suwardjono Surjaningrat	Golkar	Development III	29 March 1978	11 March 1983	
10		Suwardjono Surjaningrat	Golkar	Development IV	19 March 1983	11 March 1988	
11		Adhyatma	Golkar	Development V	21 March 1988	11 March 1993	
12		Sujudi	Golkar	Development VI	17 March 1993	11 March 1998	
13		Faried Anfasa Moeloek	Golkar	Development VII	16 March 1998	21 May 1998	
13		Faried Anfasa Moeloek	Golkar	Development Reform	23 May 1998	20 October 1999	
14		Achmad Sujudi	Independent	National Unity	29 October 1999	23 July 2001	(Note: In 2000–2001 as Minister of Health and Social Welfare)
14		Achmad Sujudi	Independent	Mutual Assistance	10 August 2001	20 October 2004	
15		Siti Fadilah Supari	Independent	United Indonesia I	21 October 2004	20 October 2009	
16		Endang Rahayu Sedyaningsih	Independent	United Indonesia II	22 October 2009	30 April 2012	
16		Endang Rahayu Sedyaningsih	Independent	United Indonesia II	30 April 2012	14 June 2012	
—		Ali Ghufron Mukti (Acting)	Independent	United Indonesia II	30 April 2012	14 June 2012	
17		Nafsiah Mboi	Independent	United Indonesia II	14 June 2012	20 October 2014	
18		Nila Moeloek	Independent	Working	27 October 2014	20 October 2019	
19		Terawan Agus Putranto	Independent	Onward Indonesia	23 October 2019	23 December 2020	
20		Budi Gunadi Sadikin	Independent	Onward Indonesia	23 December 2020	20 October 2024	
20		Budi Gunadi Sadikin	Independent	Red and White	21 October 2024	Incumbent	

== Organization ==
The ministry structure consists of:

- Office of the Minister of Health
- Office of the Deputy Minister of Health
- Secretariat General
  - Bureau of Planning and Budgeting (Indonesian: Biro Perencanaan dan Anggaran)
  - Bureau of Finance and State Assets (Indonesian: Biro Keuangan dan Barang Milik Negara)
  - Bureau of Law (Indonesian: Biro Hukum)
  - Bureau of Organisation and Human Resources (Indonesian: Biro Organisasi dan Sumber Daya Manusia)
  - Bureau of Communication and Public Services (Indonesian: Biro Komunikasi dan Pelayanan Publik)
  - Bureau of Goods and Services Procurement (Indonesian: Biro Pengadaan Barang dan Jasa)
  - Bureau of General Affairs (Indonesian: Biro Umum)
- Directorate General of Public Health (Indonesian: Direktorat Jenderal Kesehatan Masyarakat)
  - Secretariat of Directorate General
  - Directorate of Health Promotion and People Empowerment (Indonesian: Direktorat Promosi Kesehatan dan Pemberdayaan Masyarakat)
  - Directorate of Nutrition and Mother and Child Health (Indonesian: Direktorat Gizi dan Kesehatan Ibu dan Anak)
  - Directorate of Productive and Elderly Health (Indonesian: Direktorat Kesehatan Usia Produktif dan Lanjut Usia)
  - Directorate of Mental Health (Indonesian: Direktorat Kesehatan Jiwa)
  - Directorate of Public Health Governance (Indonesian: Direktorat Tata Kelola Kesehatan Masyarakat)
  - Indonesian Institute for Biomedics and Health Genomics (Indonesian: Balai Besar Biomedis dan Genomika Kesehatan)
  - Indonesian Institute for Health Biology (Indonesian: Balai Besar Biologi Kesehatan)
  - Indonesian Institute for Environmental Health Laboratory (Indonesian: Balai Besar Laboratorium Kesehatan Lingkungan)
  - Public Health Laboratories (Indonesian: Laboratorium Kesehatan Masyarakat)
    - Indonesian Institute for Public Health Laboratories, Surabaya (Indonesian: Balai Besar Laboratorium Kesehatan Masyarakat Surabaya)
    - Indonesian Institute for Public Health Laboratories, Yogyakarta (Indonesian: Balai Besar Laboratorium Kesehatan Masyarakat Yogyakarta)
    - Indonesian Institute for Public Health Laboratories, Palembang (Indonesian: Balai Besar Laboratorium Kesehatan Masyarakat Palembang)
    - Indonesian Institute for Public Health Laboratories, Jakarta (Indonesian: Balai Besar Laboratorium Kesehatan Masyarakat Jakarta)
    - Indonesian Institute for Public Health Laboratories, Banjarbaru (Indonesian: Balai Besar Laboratorium Kesehatan Masyarakat Banjarbaru)
    - Indonesian Institute for Public Health Laboratories, Makassar I (Indonesian: Balai Besar Laboratorium Kesehatan Masyarakat Makassar I)
    - Indonesian Center for Public Health Laboratories, Palembang (Indonesian: Balai Laboratorium Kesehatan Masyarakat Palembang)
    - Indonesian Center for Public Health Laboratories, Makassar II (Indonesian: Balai Laboratorium Kesehatan Masyarakat Makassar II)
    - Indonesian Center for Public Health Laboratories, Batam (Indonesian: Balai Laboratorium Kesehatan Masyarakat Batam)
    - Indonesian Center for Public Health Laboratories, Magelang (Indonesian: Balai Laboratorium Kesehatan Masyarakat Magelang)
    - Indonesian Center for Public Health Laboratories, Ambon (Indonesian: Balai Laboratorium Kesehatan Masyarakat Ambon)
    - Indonesian Center for Public Health Laboratories, Manado (Indonesian: Balai Laboratorium Kesehatan Masyarakat Manado)
    - Indonesian Center for Public Health Laboratories, Donggala (Indonesian: Balai Laboratorium Kesehatan Masyarakat Donggala)
    - Indonesian Center for Public Health Laboratories, Medan (Indonesian: Balai Laboratorium Kesehatan Masyarakat Medan)
    - Indonesian Center for Public Health Laboratories, Banjarnegara (Indonesian: Balai Laboratorium Kesehatan Masyarakat Banjarnegara)
    - Indonesian Center for Public Health Laboratories, Banda Aceh (Indonesian: Balai Laboratorium Kesehatan Masyarakat Banda Aceh)
    - Indonesian Center for Public Health Laboratories, Papua (Indonesian: Balai Laboratorium Kesehatan Masyarakat Papua)
    - Indonesian Station for Public Health Laboratories, Pangandaran (Indonesian: Loka Laboratorium Kesehatan Masyarakat Pangandaran)
    - Indonesian Station for Public Health Laboratories, Baturaja (Indonesian: Loka Laboratorium Kesehatan Masyarakat Baturaja)
    - Indonesian Station for Public Health Laboratories, Waikabubak (Indonesian: Loka Laboratorium Kesehatan Masyarakat Waikabubak)
    - Indonesian Station for Public Health Laboratories, Tanah Bumbu (Indonesian: Loka Laboratorium Kesehatan Masyarakat Tanah Bumbu)
- Directorate General of Disease Prevention and Control (Indonesian: Direktorat Jenderal Pencegahan dan Pengendalian Penyakit)
  - Secretariat of Directorate General
  - Directorate of Non-Communicable Disease Prevention and Control (Indonesian: Direktorat Pencegahan dan Pengendalian Penyakit Tidak Menular)
  - Directorate of Communicable Disease Prevention and Control (Indonesian: Direktorat Pencegahan dan Pengendalian Penyakit Menular)
  - Directorate of Immunization Management (Indonesian: Direktorat Pengelolaan Imunisasi)
  - Directorate of Health Surveillance and Quarantine (Indonesian: Direktorat Surveilans dan Kekarantinaan Kesehatan)
  - Directorate of Environmental Health (Indonesian: Direktorat Penyehatan Lingkungan)
- Directorate General of Health Service (Indonesian: Direktorat Jenderal Pelayanan Kesehatan)
  - Secretariat of Directorate General
  - Directorate of Referral Health Care (Indonesian: Direktorat Pelayanan Kesehatan Rujukan)
  - Directorate of Primary Health Care (Indonesian: Direktorat Pelayanan Kesehatan Primer)
  - Directorate of Health Care Governance (Indonesian: Direktorat Tata Kelola Pelayanan Kesehatan)
  - Directorate of Health Care Facilities (Indonesian: Direktorat Fasilitas Pelayanan Kesehatan)
  - Directorate of Health Care Quality (Indonesian: Direktorat Mutu Pelayanan Kesehatan)
- Directorate General of Pharmaceutical and Medical Devices (Indonesian: Direktorat Jenderal Kefarmasian dan Alat Kesehatan)
  - Secretariat of Directorate General
  - Directorate of Pharmaceutical and Medical Devices Resilience (Indonesian: Direktorat Ketahanan Kefarmasian dan Alat Kesehatan)
  - Directorate of Pharmaceutical Production and Distribution (Indonesian: Direktorat Produksi dan Distribusi Kefarmasian)
  - Directorate of Pharmaceutical Management and Service (Indonesian: Direktorat Pengelolaan dan Pelayanan Kefarmasian)
  - Directorate of Medical Device Production and Distribution (Indonesian: Direktorat Produksi dan Distribusi Alat Kesehatan)
  - Directorate of Medical Device Supervision (Indonesian: Direktorat Pengawasan Alat Kesehatan)
- Directorate General of Health Workers (Indonesian: Direktorat Jenderal Tenaga Kesehatan)
  - Secretariat of Directorate General
  - Directorate of Health Worker Planning (Indonesian: Direktorat Perencanaan Tenaga Kesehatan)
  - Directorate of Health Worker Supply (Indonesian: Direktorat Penyediaan Tenaga Kesehatan)
  - Directorate of Health Worker Utilization (Indonesian: Direktorat Pendayagunaan Tenaga Kesehatan)
  - Directorate of Health Worker Quality Improvement (Indonesian: Direktorat Peningkatan Mutu Tenaga Kesehatan)
  - Directorate of Health Worker Supervision and Guidance (Indonesian: Direktorat Pembinaan dan Pengawasan Tenaga Kesehatan)
- Inspectorate General
- Agency for Health Policies Development (Indonesian: Badan Kebijakan Pembangunan Kesehatan)
  - Secretariat
  - Center of Health Provision Policy (Indonesian: Pusat Kebijakan Upaya Kesehatan)
  - Center of Health System Resilience and Health Human Resource (Indonesian: Pusat Kebijakan Sistem Ketahanan Kesehatan dan Sumber Daya cytotec)
  - Center of Health Financing and Decentralisation (Indonesian: Pusat Kebijakan Pembiayaan dan Desentralisasi Kesehatan)
  - Center of Global Health and Health Technology Policy (Indonesian: Pusat Kebijakan Kesehatan Global dan Teknologi Kesehatan)
- Special Advisor on Health Economics (Indonesian: Staf Ahli Bidang Ekonomi Kesehatan)
- Special Advisor on Health Technology (Indonesian: Staf Ahli Bidang Teknologi Kesehatan)
- Special Advisor on Health Law (Indonesian: Staf Ahli Bidang Hukum Kesehatan)
- Special Advisor on Health Politics and Globalization (Indonesian: Staf Ahli Bidang Politik dan Globalisasi Kesehatan)
- Center of Data and Information Technology (Indonesian: Pusat Data dan Teknologi Informasi)
- Center of Health System and Strategy (Indonesian: Pusat Sistem dan Strategi Kesehatan)
- Center of Health Crisis (Indonesian: Pusat Krisis Kesehatan)
- Center of Ministry Civil Service Competence Development (Indonesian: Pusat Pengembangan Kompetensi Aparatur Sipil Negara)

The ministry also coordinates two non-ministry government bodies, those are National Agency of Drug and Food Control and National Population and Family Planning Board.

== Criticism ==
=== COVID-19 ===
The minister of health, Terawan Agus Putranto, often published controversial statements about COVID-19. Terawan was also under fire for his "anti-science" and "arrogant" attitude in leading the COVID-19 crisis in Indonesia. Some epidemiologist conducted research to determine locations around the world that could have undetected cases of the virus imported from abroad. Terawan comments on the study, "In my opinion, the suspicion is too far-fetched. Let Harvard to come here. The door is open for them to see. There is nothing we keep secret." Terawan was criticized for stating that flu is more dangerous than COVID-19 because flu has a higher mortality rate. However, his initial response to the spread of COVID-19, such as the initial recommendation to not wear a mask, is quite aligned with other public health officials around the world including Anthony Fauci of the United States' NIH and general directions from the World Health Organization. In November 2023, the ministry announced the establishment of an academy in Bali aligned with GISAID, the initiative that led the global documentation of the COVID-19 virus sequences. The aim of GISAID Academy will be to focus on focus on bioinformatics education, advance pathogen genomic surveillance, and increased regional response capacity.

== Literature ==
- Wasisto, Broto; et al. (2009). Sejarah Pembangunan Kesehatan Indonesia 1973–2009. Kementrian Kesehatan Republik Indonesia. ISBN 978-9799254924.
