= Ratwita Gandasoebrata =

Indonesian physician and academic

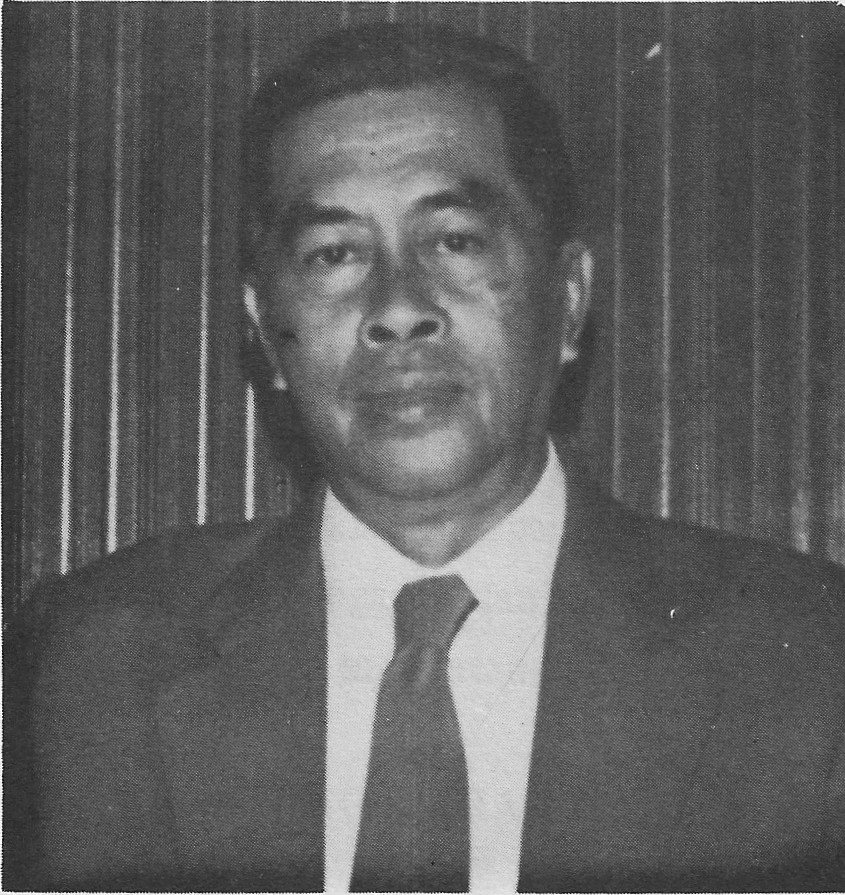

Dean of the University of Indonesia Faculty of Medicine
- In office 1977 – 10 March 1984
- Preceded by: Djamaloeddin; W. A. F. J. Tumbelaka (acting)
- Succeeded by: Asri Rasad

Personal details
- Born: 26 October 1919 Magelang, Central Java, Dutch East Indies
- Spouse: Lucie Mohede
- Children: 4
- Education: University of Indonesia (dr., Prof.); University of California, San Francisco

Ratwita Gandasoebrata (26 October 1919 – after 1984) was an Indonesian physician and a professor of clinical pathology at the University of Indonesia. He was known for his role in pioneering the development of clinical pathology in Indonesia. He also served as the dean of the University of Indonesia's medical faculty from 1977 to 1984.

== Early life and education ==
Born on 26 October 1919 in Magelang, Ratwita studied at the Hogere Burgerschool (HBS, equivalent to high school) in Magelang from 1932 to 1937, passing the final exam after a second attempt. He then attended the Geneeskundige Hoogeschool (GHS, Medical College), passing the 1st candidate exam in 1938 and the 2nd candidate exam in 1941. He also worked as a student candidate in 1939 until the college's closure by the Japanese authorities following the Japanese occupation of the Dutch East Indies in 1942. He then moved to Bogor to work as a lecturer at the Bogor veterinary school (predecessor to the Bogor Agricultural Institute). He resumed his studies after the Indonesian National Revolution, completing his final exam in March 1952, after the college became part of the University of Indonesia.

== Medical career ==
Upon graduating, Ratwita joined the University of Indonesia's biochemical department under L. N. Went, the department's chair. Went conducted research on the normal values for biochemical compounds in the blood specific to Indonesian individuals, which was necessary because laboratories in Indonesia relied on standard values derived from Western populations. The research involved meticulous analyses, such as determining plasma protein levels using the Kjeldahl method and electrophoresis (with equipment assembled themselves), as well as measuring serum calcium by titration and urine sodium and potassium using a flame photometer. The research sparked Ratwita's interest in applied research to address major health concerns of the era. Sometime later, Ratwita succeeded Went as the department's chair.

At the end of 1955, Ratwita was asked by the-then dean of the University of Indonesia's medicine faculty, Soedjono Djoened Poesponegoro, to establish a clinical pathology department in the faculty. The establishment of the department was intended to bridge the basic medicine department and the clinical medicine department. The new department was assisted by the University of California, San Francisco in the provision of medical supplies, and took over the clinical laboratory previously under the internal medicine department. These actions allowed for the expansion and improvement of laboratory examination services, gradually taking over diagnostic test responsibilities previously managed by the Eijkman Institute. Ratwita also recruited staff members from the University of California, such as Aprians, J. S. Carr, and J. S. Wellington, and from his own students, such as Jeane Latu and Siti Boedina Kresno. Ratwita's founding role of the clinical department at the university led to his recognition as a pioneer of clinical pathology in Indonesia.

After establishing the department, Ratwita broadened his expertise in clinical pathology at the University of California, San Francisco, completing his education in 1961. Several months prior, on 17 December 1960, Ratwita delivered his speech as full professor in clinical pathology, titled Relationship Between Laboratory and Clinic (Indonesian: Hubungan antara laboratorium dan klinik). His speech was noted for using the American Society for Clinical Pathology's definition of clinical pathology. In his speech, Ratwita also emphasized that clinical pathology is an inseparable part of clinical medicine expertise, as "all kinds of clinical examinations starts with a patient and ends if a patient has truly recovered". In 1968, Ratwita wrote a guidance book for clinical laboratorary, titled Penuntun Laboratorium Klinik.

In 1973, Ratwita, along with other expert witnesses from the faculty of medicine (including future University of Indonesia rector Muhammad Kamil Tadjudin) testified regarding the gender confirmation surgery of Vivian Rubianti in front of the court. According to their testimony, Rubianti had undergone gender transition to woman and that she has the personality of a woman. Rubianti became the first transgender in Indonesia to have their gender affirming surgery recognized by the court.

On 6 December 1976, Ratwita was elected as the dean of the University of Indonesia's medicine faculty, replacing Djamaloeddin who resigned due to health issues. He assumed office in 1977 and served for two three-year terms until he was succeeded by Asri Rasad, his first deputy, on 10 March 1984.

For his contribution to the development of medicine, Ratwita received the Satyalancana Karya Satya, 1st Class medal. He was also a member of several medical organizations, such as the Union of Indonesian Physicians, Union of Clinical Pathology Experts, International Society of Hematology, and the International Society of Clinical Chemistry.

== Publications ==
Throughout his life, Ratwita has authored a number of articles relating to medicine:

- "Dextran Sebagai Pengganti Darah". Majalah Kedokteran Indonesia. No. 4. 1954. p. 240.
- Went, L. N.; Gandasoebrata, R. R. (1955). "Some investigations into the blood chemistry of kwashiorkor". Documenta de Medicina Geographica et Tropica. 7 (4): 363–370. ISSN 0366-9378. PMID 13305474.
- "Thrombopathia hemaphilica". Majalah Kedokteran Indonesia. No. 9. 1963. p. 282.
- Kresno, Siti Boedina; Gandasoebrata, R.; Rümke, Ph (30 May 1970). "SERUM α-FETOPROTEIN IN INDONESIA". The Lancet. 295 (7657): 1178. doi:10.1016/S0140-6736(70)91253-5. ISSN 0140-6736.

== Personal life ==
Ratwita was married to Lucie Mohede and has four children.
