= Partomo Moegihardjo Alibazah =

Indonesian diplomat (1930–1980)

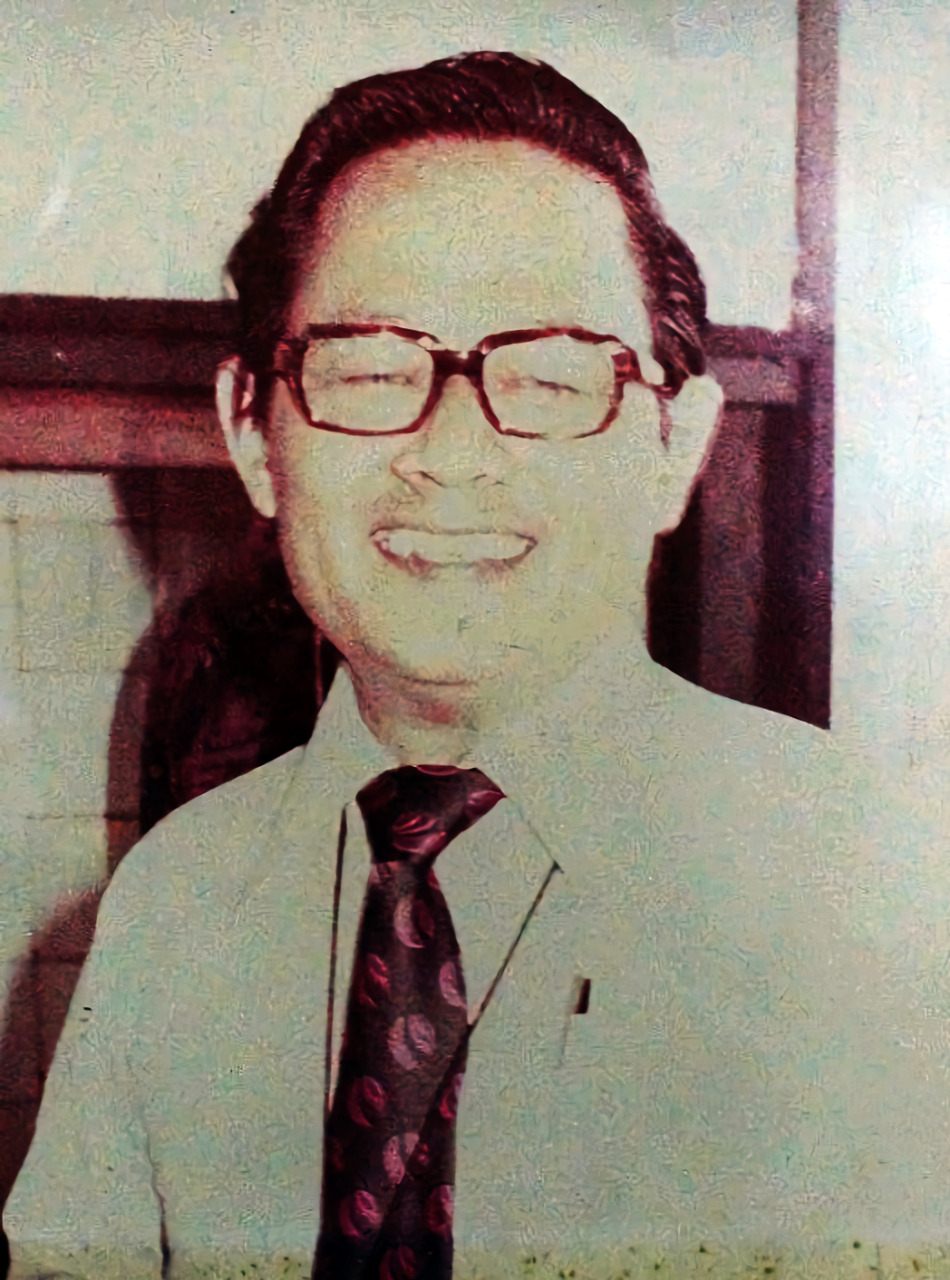

Permanent Delegate of Indonesia to UNESCO
- In office 15 September 1977 – 18 December 1980
- President: Suharto
- Preceded by: Soepojo Padmodipoetro
- Succeeded by: Achjani Atmakusuma

Deputy Rector for Academic Affairs of the University of Indonesia
- In office 1973 – August 1977
- Preceded by: Slamet Iman Santoso
- Succeeded by: Sujudi

Personal details
- Born: July 3, 1930 Bandung, West Java, Dutch East Indies
- Died: December 18, 1980 (aged 50) Paris, France
- Spouse: Wiendrati Pringgodigdo
- Education: University of Indonesia (dr.); University of California, Berkeley (Dr.)

Partomo Moegihardjo Alibazah (3 July 1930 – 18 December 1980) was an Indonesian academic and diplomat. He served as the Deputy Rector of University of Indonesia for Academic Affairs from 1973 to 1977 and as permanent delegate of Indonesia to the United Nations Educational, Scientific and Cultural Organization from 1977 until his death in 1980.

== Early life and education ==
Born on 3 July 1930 in Bandung, Partomo studied medicine at the University of Indonesia (UI). He completed his first candidate exam in March 1953, second candidate exam in June 1955, and received his degree in 1959. He continued his education in genetics at the University of California, Berkeley, where he received his doctorate degree. He also attended a course at the National Resilience Institute in 1976, while serving as UI's deputy rector. During the course, he received the Garuda Nugraha Award for his personality and achievements and the Seroja Nugraha Award for his written work.

== Career ==
Partomo began teaching at the biology department in UI's medicine faculty in 1961 and was entrusted to led the department shortly after. He was known as a lecturer who was close to his students. Under dean Sjahriar Rasad, Partomo was entrusted to chair the education measurement bureau and as Rasad's second deputy dean, responsible for finance and administration. He also became the Chairman of the Governing Board of the Southeast Asian Regional Centre for Tropical Biology. After his appointed as the secretary of the Indonesian Medical Consortium under chairman Mahar Mardjono (later UI rector), Partomo resigned from his position as chairman in May 1971.

In the early 1960s, Partomo, along with Mahar and Biran Affandi (later chairman of UI council of professors) visited Pyongyang to meet with Kim Bong-han. Upon returning to Indonesia, Partomo attempted to replicate Kim's experiment on the Kyungrak system in the biology department.

After Mahar Mardjono became UI's rector in 1973, Partomo was appointed as his first deputy, which was responsible for academic affairs. Partomo was a staunch supporter for the development of public health studies in Indonesia, and he approved plans to develop UI's faculty of public health.

In August 1977, Partomo was appointed as Indonesia's permanent delegate to the UNESCO. He presented his credentials on 15 September 1977. During this period, Partomo was influential in lobbying UNESCO to provide training for Indonesian journalists.

== Personal life ==
Partomo publicly announced his engagement with Indrawati Roosheroe, who would later become a full professor on mycology at UI, on 16 July 1955. Less than two years later, on 15 February 1957 the pair announced their separation. Partomo later married Wiendrati Pringgodigdo, a lawyer and the eldest child of Abdul Karim Pringgodigdo, former cabinet secretary and chairman of Indonesia's audit board.

Partomo died at 18.00 on 18 December 1980 in Paris at the age of 50 due to cardiovascular disease. His body was brought to Indonesia, where it was formally handed over to the family in a ceremony led by Inspector General of the Foreign Department, Lieutenant-General Sarwo Edhie Wibowo. His body was interred at the Cibatok cemetery, Bogor, on 25 December in a ceremony led by Minister of Education and Culture Daoed Joesoef.
