= Djamaloeddin =

Indonesian surgeon (1916–1995)

Dean of the University of Indonesia Faculty of Medicine
- In office 21 March 1974 – August 1976
- Preceded by: Mahar Mardjono
- Succeeded by: W. A. F. J. Tumbelaka (acting); Ratwita Gandasoebrata

Personal details
- Born: May 6, 1916 Bukittinggi, West Sumatra, Dutch East Indies
- Died: December 14, 1995 (aged 79) Jakarta, Indonesia
- Spouse: Azizah Chatib
- Relations: Ali Emran (brother)
- Children: 4
- Parents: Mohammad Amin (father); Siti Rawiyah (mother)
- Education: Geneeskundige Hoogeschool; University of California, San Francisco

Djamaloeddin (6 May 1916 – 14 December 1995) was an Indonesian surgeon and a professor of surgery at the University of Indonesia. He was a member of the presidential medical team and the dean of the University of Indonesia's faculty of medicine from 1974 to 1976. He was noted for successfully operating on two Indonesian presidents, Sukarno and Suharto.

== Early life and education ==
Djamaloeddin was born on 6 May 1916, in Bukittinggi, West Sumatra, into a respected Minangkabau family. His father, Mohammad Amin—holding the title Tuanku Laras Pariangan Simabur—occupied a revered local position, and his mother, Siti Rawiyah, traced her ancestry to a noble Javanese line through Mas Ajeng Moersiah. Djamaloeddin was the seventh child among eight siblings, of whom he and his youngest brother, Ali Emran, both became surgeons. Despite his family's position, economic hardship arose after his father resigned over disagreements with Dutch authorities, compelling his mother to support the family by catering for students at the Kweekschool in Bukittinggi.

Djamaloeddin's early educational experience was shaped by adversity. He was initially denied entry to the European-speaking Europesche Lagere School (ELS) due to a misunderstanding during the language admissions test, resulting in a temporary hiatus from formal schooling. At age eight, his mother enrolled him at the Hollandsch-Inlandsche School (HIS, equivalent to elementary school), where he studied from 1924 to 1930. After completing HIS, Djamaloeddin attended the Meer Uitgebreid Lager Onderwijs (MULO, equivalent to middle school) in Bukittinggi from 1930 to 1934. He excelled in mathematics and actively participating in extracurricular organizations, eventually serving as chairman of the student's union. During this period, he encountered early challenges from Dutch colonial authorities for political activities, notably after students sang Indonesia Raya at a public event, leading to disciplinary action against his peers.

Aiming for higher education, Djamaloeddin took supplementary lessons in German and French to fulfill entry requirements for the Hogere Burgerschool (HBS, equivalent to high school) in Batavia. He attended the Koning Willem II School from 1934 to 1936 and joined the Oesaha Kita student extracurricular organization alongside with students from other HBS. His involvement in the organization was marked with a leadership dispute between Chairul Saleh from Koning Willem II and Sumitro Djojohadikusumo from Prins Hendrik. Djamaloeddin sided with Chairul Saleh during the dispute.

== Career ==
=== Early medical career ===
After graduating from HBS, Djamaloeddin enrolled at the Geneeskundige Hoogeschool (GHS, Medical College) in Salemba, Batavia (now Jakarta), studying from 1936 to 1944, with interruptions during the Japanese occupation of the Dutch East Indies. He initially intended to study pharmacy in the Netherlands but was barred by financial constraints. He became active in the Indonesian Students' Union (PPI, Perkumpulan Pelajar Indonesia), a non-cooperative student group, while residing at the Clubhuis Indonesia (now Gedung Sumpah Pemuda). The turmoil of World War II delayed his studies, during which he worked at the Eijkman Institute's bacterial laboratory, gaining early laboratory experience and developing a lifelong interest in immunization and public health.

He resumed his degree during the occupation and graduated in 1944. Djamaloeddin was drafted as a captain-doctor (Eisei Cudanco) in the PETA forces stationed in Bali until 1945, after which he volunteered in the surgical ward of the Jakarta Central Hospital (now Dr. Cipto Mangunkusumo Hospital) before his official appointment in the Ministry of Health under minister Boentaran Martoatmodjo. Between 1946 and 1950, he was assigned to treat victims of conflict across West Java and Yogyakarta, notably during the Operation Product. When the Dutch took over the central hospital in Jakarta, Djamaloeddin refused to work for them, instead opening a private practice between 1948 and 1950.

Following the establishment of the United States of Indonesia (RIS), he returned to the Jakarta Central Hospital to specialize in surgery, completing his training with a surgical specialist certification on 4 July 1951. By 1952, he became a junior lecturer at the University of Indonesia's medicine faculty. Between 1953 and 1954, Djamaloeddin broadened his expertise in general surgery at the University of California, San Francisco, and undertook a study tour of several university hospitals in the United States.

=== Landmark surgeries ===
Upon returning, he rapidly advanced through academic ranks to become senior lecturer. In 1957, Djamaloeddin and other surgeons successfully separated Indonesia's first conjoined twins, Karina and Karini, in a complex operation that set a precedent for pediatric surgery in the country. The surgery was led by Margono Soekarjo, then chairman of University of Indonesia's department of surgery. Despite limited resources and rudimentary anesthesia techniques, the operation was a success, and both twins survived to adulthood.

Two years later, in 1959, Djamaloeddin was summoned to the state palace to examine, and later operate President Sukarno's swollen and pus-filled left big toe. Sukarno was initially reluctant, but he relented after Djamaloeddin warned him of the possibility of amputation if the left toe remained untreated. Health minister Johannes Leimena and deputy minister for people's industry Soeharto Sastrosoeyoso pinned down Sukarno during the operation. After the operation, the following day, President Sukarno stood up and received the Philippine Secretary of Foreign Affairs Felixberto Serrano as a guest, wearing a shoe with the left tip removed to accommodate his healing toe.

=== Dean of the medicine faculty and presidential physician ===
Djamaloeddin was appointed as a full professor in medicine in 1961, with his inaugural lecture as a full professor, titled Aspects of Surgery, being delivered in 1962. On 21 March 1974, Djamaloeddin became the dean of the University of Indonesia's medicine faculty, replacing rector Mahar Mardjono who had concurrently held the office for a few months. As dean, Djamaloeddin signed a cooperation agreement between the faculty and the department of health to develop community health centers throughout Indonesia. Djamaloeddin was re-elected by the faculty's senate for another term as dean in late April 1976, though he resigned in August due health conditions. W. A. F. J. Tumbelaka, Djamaloeddin's first deputy, took over his duties in an acting capacity until Ratwita Gandasubrata was elected as permanent dean on 6 December.

On the same year as his appointment as the faculty's dean, Djamaloeddin also became a member of the presidential medical team. In 1976, by the request of health minister G. A. Siwabessy, Djamaloeddin conducted a surgery on President Suharto, who suffered from gallbladder inflammation and a thickened gallbladder wall. A day after surgery, Suharto was made to stand and sit repeatedly despite significant pain. President Suharto was discharged from the hospital after one week. Two days after discharge, Djamaloeddin visited his residence to remove surgical stitches. As a token of appreciation, by the request of Djamaloeddin, Soeharto funded the construction of a floor of the Sint Carolus Hospital's Theresia Pavilion. Suharto also gave Djamaloeddin a wristwatch inscribed with "souvenir from Suharto, Indonesia's president".

In 1979, Djamaloeddin decided to undergo surgical treatment for his spinal disc herniation, which caused considerable discomfort, in Groningen, Netherlands. During the preparations for this operation, his former student, Padmosantjojo, traveled to the Netherlands as well. Under the guise of research, Padmosantjojo went to support his mentor throughout the surgery process by finding accommodation, driving him around, and providing assistance during the surgical procedure itself. Djamaloeddin retired in 1981 and continued his service as a member of the presidential medical team and a physician at a private hospital in Jakarta.

== Personal life ==
Djamaloeddin married Azizah Chatib, with whom he had four children. His daughter, Chaula Luthfia Sukasah, followed his footsteps as a surgeon and participated in the separation of craniopagus twins of Yuliana and Yuliani.

== Publications ==
A recognized authority on a range of surgical conditions, Djamaloeddin published numerous scientific articles. His research included early work on diagnostic immunology and comprehensive accounts of cancer incidence in Indonesia. He also contributed presentations on topics such as breast cancer, management of advanced cancer, and public health advocacy for motorcycle helmet use.

- Die Idee Reaktien in des Lues Diagnotik, MKI (1947)
- Kanker Ureter Kanan, RS Cipto Mangunkusumo (1952)
- Trauma Tumpul Abdomen in Buku Kursus Penyegaran (1959)
- Pendarahan dari Dubur in Buku Kursus Penyegaran (1968)
- Cancer Colon Reactie, published as a conference paper (1979)
- On the Ethologie Factor of Dolorectal Cancer in Indonesia, published as a part of lecture for the ASEAN Surgical Conference in Jakarta (1980)
- Kanker Payudara, published for the 1st meeting of the Indonesian Cancer Foundation (1981)
- Cancer of Colozectal, Incidenced in the General Hospital Jakarta at the Pan Pacific Surgical Conference, Honolulu
- Agnesia Ginjal Kanan
- Kanker Payu Dara dan Kehamilan, MKI
- Penanggulangan Advanced Cancer pada Umumnya, published for the tumour surgeon's regular meeting
- Usul Mengundangkan Pemakaian Helm oleh Pengendara Motor, published as the chairman of the seminar on Helmet Use by Motorcyclists
