= Sutanto Wiryoprasonto =

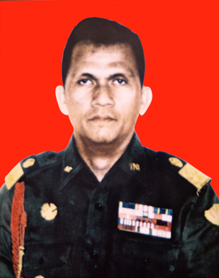

Deputy Chairman of the National Education Advisory Body
- In office 1989–1993

Member of the National Education Advisory Body
- In office December 6, 1989 – 1998

Secretary General of the Department of Education and Culture
- In office April 28, 1980 – January 12, 1987
- Preceded by: Teuku Umar Ali
- Succeeded by: Bambang Triantoro

Personal details
- Born: July 24, 1924 Surakarta, Central Java, Dutch East Indies
- Died: April 3, 2000 (aged 75)

Military service
- Allegiance: Indonesia
- Branch/service: Indonesian Army
- Years of service: 1944—1979
- Rank: Lieutenant general
- Unit: Infantry

Sutanto Wiryoprasonto (24 July 1924 – 3 April 2000) was a high-ranking army officer and bureaucrat from Indonesia. He served as commander of the armed forces staff and command college from 1974 to 1977 and secretary general of the Department of Education and Culture from 1980 to 1987.

== Early life and education ==
Sutanto Wiryoprasonto was born in Surakarta on July 24, 1924. His father, R. Wirjoprasonto, was a batik merchant and actively involved as treasurer in the Muhammadiyah Surakarta organization. His mother, Sri Sari, was the younger sister of the father of former Minister of Mines Subroto. He was the second of three children in his family.

Sutanto attended the Hollandsch-Inlandsche School (HIS) Muhammadiyah Bersubsidi in Surakarta from 1930 to 1937. While there, he befriended Hetami (Editor-in-Chief of Harian Suara Merdeka) and Imam Soepomo (later ambassador to Papua New Guinea). He then continued his education at Meer Uitgebreid Lager Onderwijs (MULO) Surakarta from 1937 to 1940. His classmates at MULO Surakarta included former DKI Governor R. Soeprapto and Tjokropranolo as well as ambassador to Singapore Soenarso. While attending HIS and MULO, Sutanto was active in the Hizbul Wathan scouting movement.

After completing MULO, Sutanto wanted to pursue higher education, but his parents refused, fearing that Sutanto would be influenced by Dutch customs and abandon their religion. Sutanto then peddled from village to village using a bicycle.

== Japanese occupation and the Indonesian National Revolution ==
During the Japanese occupation, Sutanto underwent military education at Bo-ei Giyugun Kanbu Kyo Iku Tai (Volunteer Army Leadership Training Center) which was specifically designed to train officers (shodanchō) for the Defenders of the Homeland (PETA) unit. This training center was established in Bogor and opened in 1942. A number of MULO Surakarta graduates, such as R. Soeprapto, Tjokropranolo, Soenarso, and Soedirgo (who would later become Head of the State Intelligence Coordinating Body), also attended this education. After completing this education, Soetanto was chosen by the training center commander, First Lieutenant Yanagawa Motoshige, to undergo further training for six months. After undergoing further training, Sutanto was assigned as a member of Tokubetsu Yugekitai (Special Guerrilla Force), a special unit within PETA tasked with conducting intelligence activities.

After completing military education, Sutanto was appointed as an instructor for PETA prospective soldiers in Tawangmangu, Surakarta. Sutanto secretly attempted to connect three PETA central headquarters in Java, which had been deliberately separated by the Japanese occupation government to avoid threats to their rule.

Sutanto joined the People's Security Army after the Proclamation of Indonesian Independence in 1945. He immediately obtained the rank of captain and served as commander of a rifle company in battalion 4 in Surakarta. As company commander, Sutanto led the lowering of the Japanese flag at the Surakarta post office and Kempetai headquarters. The company he led was then sent to the Srondol front, Semarang, to face attacks from the Dutch army. In 1947, his company was transferred to the Padalarang front as part of Commando I West Java. Sutanto was then transferred to Tengaran, Salatiga, during the Dutch's Operation Product.

Sutanto continued to serve as company commander in Tengaran until the Operation Kraai. Sutanto was promoted to battalion chief of staff after the incident and was tasked with marking the demarcation line between the Indonesian-controlled Salatiga Front and the Dutch. At the same time, the Madiun Affair broke out. Sutanto was tasked by military governor Gatot Subroto to infiltrate Wonogiri, which had been controlled by the PKI, along with Tjokropranolo and Slamet Riyadi. After the rebellion was suppressed, Sutanto was again tasked with securing Surakarta city from rebellion along with the Siliwangi Division from West Java. Sutanto again faced the Dutch and engaged in guerrilla warfare in the Surakarta-Tawangmangu-Sukoharjo triangle area. Around the time of the Dutch–Indonesian Round Table Conference and the transfer of sovereignty, Sutanto became a liaison officer in Sukoharjo.

After the recognition of sovereignty, rebellions occurred in several regions in Indonesia, and Sutanto was again tasked with confronting them. He was sent to Bandung as part of the Slamet Riyadi Brigade task force to face the APRA coup d'état and to Leles, Garut, to face the DI/TII rebellion led by Sekarmadji Maridjan Kartosoewirjo. Some time later, the separatist Republic of South Maluku rebellion occurred, and Sutanto was again sent there as part of the Slamet Riyadi Brigade task force.

== Post-revolution period ==
Sutanto was appointed as the deputy commander of the 423rd infantry battalion. The 423rd and 426th were two infantry battalions largely filled by former Hizbullah members and were close to DI/TII in Central Java. Both battalions were later inspected by Suharto, who would later become president, as the brigade commander overseeing them. During the inspection process, the commander of the 423rd infantry battalion, Major Basuno, was killed by his own men who were influenced by DI/TII. On the other hand, the 426th infantry battalion revolted to join DI/TII. Sutanto, as the second-in-command of the battalion, was tasked with preventing his battalion from joining the rebels and suppressing the rebellion. The 423rd infantry battalion was then sent to Maluku to face the Republic of South Maluku rebellion.

Sutanto was promoted to commander of battalion 438 in 1952. His battalion was deployed to Bantarkuwung and Genteng to face the DI/TII rebellion in those areas. He then attended advanced military education at the Indonesian Army Command and General Staff College, Bandung, from 1954 to 1955. After completing his education at SSKAD, Sutanto was appointed by Soeharto, who at that time served as commander of the Diponegoro's Military Regional Command, as his third assistant. Soeharto was later dismissed from his position as commander, and Sutanto was transferred to become Commander of Diponegoro's 2nd Combat Regiment in West Sumatra to face the Revolutionary Government of the Republic of Indonesia (PRRI). The troops he led successfully recaptured Lubuk Sikaping, Lubuk Basung, Lintau, Suliki, and Koto Tinggi from PRRI.

Sutanto again pursued advanced military education at the Defence Services Staff College, India, from 1960 to 1961. He was then assigned to the Indonesian Army Command and General Staff College as a lecturer and was promoted to head of staff and general knowledge department in 1963 and head of the infantry department in 1964. He was transferred to the army infantry center to serve as deputy commander until 1968. While serving at the center, he formulated the Infantry Doctrine, New Style Infantry, Shooting Proficiency Criteria, and designated the end of the Battle of Ambarawa on 15 December as the Infantry Day.

Sutanto returned to Indonesian Army Command and General Staff College in 1968 as deputy commander. Sutanto was then promoted to commander on November 1, 1970. Under his leadership, Seskoad successfully organized the army inheritance seminar which produced the book Dharma Pusaka 1945. Sutanto ended his term as Commander of Seskoad on March 20, 1974. He then served as commanding general of the armed forces staff and command school from May 9, 1974 to October 10, 1977. Sutanto retired from the military on August 1, 1979, with the rank of lieutenant general.

== Government career and retirement ==
A few months after retiring, Sutanto was proposed by Sudomo to be placed in Operasi Tertib. Sudomo's proposal was rejected by President Suharto, who then placed him in the Department of Education and Culture. Sutanto was installed as secretary general of the Department of Education and Culture on April 28, 1980, replacing Teuku Umar Ali.

As secretary-general, Sutanto proposed training staffs in the education and training center to overcome inconsistencies in carrying out duties. This proposal led to integrated annual planning through a national working meeting for implementing ministerial policies. He also oversaw the establishment of branch offices of the Department of Education and Culture in regencies and cities in the newly incorporated East Timor.

On September 27, 1980, Sutanto issued a decree prohibiting institutions under the Department of Education and Culture, including state universities, from reading and possessing the novel Bumi Manusia by Pramoedya Ananta Toer. This prohibition was later confirmed by the regional department office and the secretariat of Bandung Institute of Technology. Sutanto reasoned that the novel Bumi Manusia "contains elements of class struggle that are alarming." The book's publisher, PT Hasta Mitra, responded to the ban by stating that "anyone with a proper understanding of class conflict theory would be embarrassed by the notion that such a theory can be found in Bumi Manusia." Nevertheless, Sutanto did not budge from his prohibition. His ban was reinforced by a decree issued by attorney general Ismail Saleh on May 29, 1981, prohibiting the circulation of the book Bumi Manusia throughout Indonesia.

After serving as secretary-general for almost eight years, on January 12, 1987, Sutanto was replaced by Bambang Triantoro. Sutanto was then appointed as a member of the National Education Advisory Body, an institution formed to provide advice to the Minister of Education and Culture. Sutanto was inaugurated in 1989 and elected as deputy chairman of the body. He served as deputy chairman until 1993 and was re-elected as a member of the BPPN for a second term until 1998. Sutanto died two years later on April 3, 2000, and was buried at the Kalibata Heroes Cemetery.

== Personal life ==
Sutanto married a woman in the early 1950s and had three children. His wife died in 1977 due to a heart attack. Sutanto then remarried in 1978 to Sutarni, his former girlfriend who had become a widow after her husband's death in 1964. Sutanto and Sutarni then performed the Hajj pilgrimage in 1979. The couple had six children: three children from Sutanto's first marriage and three children from Sutarni's marriage to her first husband.
