= Asman Boedisantoso Ranakusuma =

Indonesian physician

Rector of the University of Indonesia
- In office 16 February 1998 – 28 February 2002
- Preceded by: Muhammad Kamil Tadjudin
- Succeeded by: Usman Chatib Warsa

Deputy Rector for Academic Affairs of the University of Indonesia
- In office 13 April 1994 – 1998
- Preceded by: Muhammad Kamil Tadjudin
- Succeeded by: Usman Chatib Warsa

Personal details
- Born: 28 January 1946 (age 80) Magelang, Indonesia
- Education: University of Indonesia

Asman Boedisantoso Ranakusuma (born 28 January 1946) is an Indonesian physician and academician who served as the Rector of the University of Indonesia from 1998 to 2002.

== Early life and education ==
Asman was born on 28 January 1946 in Magelang, Indonesia. Many members of his family were physicians. Asman finished his secondary school education at the 1st Magelang State High School in 1964 and continued his tertiary education at the faculty of medicine of the University of Indonesia (UI). He graduated from UI with an undergraduate medical degree in 1970. Asman pursued further studies in internal medicine at UI's Dr. Cipto Mangunkusumo Hospital from 1971 and obtained a licence as a physician of internal medicine in 1976.

== Career ==
Asman began his career at the Dr. Cipto Mangunkusumo Hospital as a physician-scientist. He worked in the hospital's immuno-endocrinology laboratory and coordinated the hospital's diabetes and lipid research program. In 1983, the hospital sent him to study diabetes at various universities in Japan. Three years later, on 13 January 1986, Asman obtained his Doctor of Medicine degree. He was made as a full professor of medicine in 1993.

While working at the hospital, Asman developed a method to extract thyroid tissue by using fine-needle non-aspiration cytology (FNNAC) and fine-needle aspiration cytology (FNAC) techniques. He was nicknamed the "fine needle warrior" for his method. His efforts in treating various thyroid anomalies prompted further research into the integrated treatment of thyroid cancer.

On 13 April 1994, Asman was appointed by UI rector Muhammad Kamil Tadjudin as the first deputy rector of UI. As first deputy rector, Asman would sometimes commute to the university by train, which let him "inconspicuously" overhear discussion and criticism of the university from students. He was also involved in implementing a non-thesis degree policy for the university which allowed students to graduate without publishing a thesis.

== Rector of the University of Indonesia ==
Asman replaced Tadjudin as UI's rector on 16 February 1998 following an election by the university's academic senate. During his early months as rector, the student movement which demanded the resignation of Indonesia's longtime president Suharto was in full swing. Asman threw his support behind the movement by vacationing the students indefinitely and refused the education minister's demands to limit the protests. In May 1998, Asman, along with Tadjudin and other UI academicians, visited President Suharto at his residence to discuss about his resignation and succession. After Suharto resigned from the presidency, there were proposals from the students to form a collective government which consisted of academicians and other notable figures, including Asman. Asman continued to be involved in politics, and his role in Indonesian politics led to him being awarded an honorary degree in education and politics from Sōka University in October 2001.

In 1999, UI implemented a new tuition fee policy, which required the students to pay an additional fee on top of their regular tuition fee. The decision was widely unpopular among students and a protest was mounted against the policy on the occasion of UI's 50th anniversary in October 2000. A month later, Asman suspended six leading students of the protest. The students filed a lawsuit against Asman in an attempt to revoke their suspension. The court sided with the students and ordered the rector to remove the suspension and pay the students a total of 500,000 rupiahs (US$48.73). However, Asman refused to comply with the court's demand and continued the suspension of the students.

As rector, Asman pushed for a financially independent UI. The concept was finally realised following a government decree in December 2000, which transformed UI into a "state-owned legal entity" with the rights to manage its own finance. The decree also established a board of trustees for UI, which was tasked with electing the rector and preparing the university's budget. The board of trustees held a plenary session on 20 February 2002 and decided to appoint Usman Chatib Warsa, Asman's first deputy, as his acting replacement until a new definitive rector was elected. Asman handed over his office to Usman eight days after the session.

== Later life ==
After his term as rector ended, Asman began to teach in the faculty of medicine. He also worked as an endocrinologist in various state and private hospitals. Due to his experience in managing student acceptance tests, Asman became the chairman of the Association of Indonesian New Student Admissions Selection from 2010 to 2011.

== Personal life ==
Asman is married to Amikahyati Moelyo. The couple has four children.
