= Teuku Umar Ali =

Indonesian diplomat and academic (1930–1992)

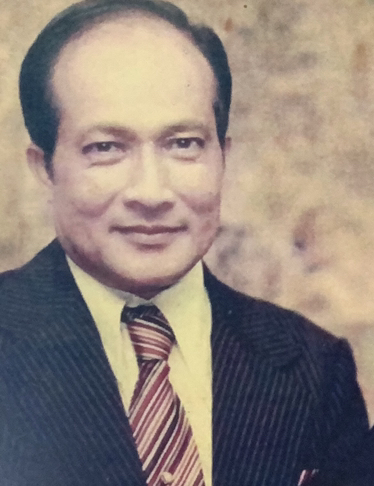

Indonesia Ambassador to Brazil, Peru, Bolivia, and Colombia
- In office 1 September 1980 – 24 December 1983
- President: Suharto
- Preceded by: Adiwoso Abubakar
- Succeeded by: Soetadi

Secretary General of the Department of Education and Culture
- In office 3 July 1972 – 28 April 1980
- Preceded by: Soepojo Padmodipoetro
- Succeeded by: Sutanto Wiryoprasonto

Secretary General of the Department of Trade
- In office 10 January 1984 – 26 October 1988
- Preceded by: Lalu Manambai Abdul Kadir
- Succeeded by: Bakir Hasan

Personal details
- Born: March 22, 1930 Banda Aceh, Aceh, Dutch East Indies
- Died: March 24, 1992 (aged 62) Jakarta, Indonesia
- Spouse: Cut Arufah Nasir (m. 1957)
- Children: 6, including Tjut Rifameutia
- Parents: Teuku Ali Basyah (father); Cut Nyak Zainab (mother)
- Relatives: Teuku Nyak Arief
- Education: University of Indonesia (Drs.)

Teuku Umar Ali (22 March 1930 – 24 March 1992) was an Indonesian academic, bureaucrat, and diplomat, who served in various positions in the Indonesian government. He served as secretary general of the department of education from 1972 to 1980 and the department of trade from 1984 to 1988. In the foreign service, he served as education attaché to Japan from 1968 to 1972 and ambassador to Brazil, Peru, Bolivia, and Colombia from 1980 to 1983.

== Early life and education ==
Umar Ali was born on 22 March 1930 in Banda Aceh as the son Teuku Ali Basyah, a judge at the Banda Aceh District Court, and Cut Nyak Zainab. He had five siblings, Cut Nyak Djariah, Teuku Abdurrachman, Teuku Sofyan, Teuku Asnawi, and Teuku Asmi.

Umar completed his education at the Hollandsch-Inlandsche School (elementary school for native Indonesians) at Banda Aceh in 1942, then continued to a four-year state junior high school in the same city. In 1946, he moved to Pematang Siantar for high school, but his studies were cut short within a year due to the Dutch occupation, as he refused to attend Dutch-run schools. During this period, he served as a liaison for Indonesian army in Medan. In 1947, a provisional Republican high school was established, which he attended until 1950 when it officially became a state senior high school.

He then moved to Jakarta to study law at the University of Indonesia. He later moved to the economic faculty, and graduated with a degree in economics on 24 May 1956. During his studies, he worked at the Department of Religious Affairs library from 1951 to 1952, and as assistant for labor affairs at the State Planning Bureau until 1954. From 1957 to 1959, he pursued further studied in rural development and credit at the Cornell University as part of Ford Foundation's affiliation program between the University of Indonesia and the University of California.

== Career ==
Umar taught economics at the University of Indonesia in intermittent periods between 1954 and 1973. In his faculty, Umar was entrusted to head the faculty's social and economic research institute from 1954 to 1957. He was also the deputy secretary and the deputy dean in the faculty, as well as the faculty's coordinator for affiliation programs from 1963 to 1964. At the same time, in 1963 the university's rector Sjarif Thajeb appointed Umar as his deputy for finance and administration affairs. As part of his academic endeavors, in 1956, sponsored by The Asia Foundation, he visited Singapore, Malaysia, Thailand, Burma, Hong Kong, the Philippines, and Japan. Between 1953 and 1957, he conducted socio-economic surveys in North Sulawesi, Bali, Aceh, North Sumatra, West Java, Jakarta, Yogyakarta, and East Java.

Following Sjarief Thajeb's appointment as the minister of higher education, Umar followed him and served as his second assistant for finance and administration affairs. He retained his position throughout government re-organizations, until the position was dissolved in 1966. He subsequently became the director for development in the Directorate General of Higher Education, serving under director general Mashuri Saleh until its disestablishment in 1968. He was then assigned to the Indonesian embassy in Tokyo as education attaché until 1972. On 3 July 1972, Umar assumed duties as the secretary general of the Department of Education. He also became an ex officio member of the supervisory board of the Central Civil Servant Corps and Dharma Wanita Pusat.

In August 1972, he represented the education minister at the inauguration of the Enhanced Spelling System in Kuala Lumpur. As the daily chairman of the Indonesian National Commission for UNESCO, he made visits to East Malaysia, Okinawa, the Philippines, Taiwan, South Korea, and Thailand. He led the Indonesian delegation to the Extraordinary General Conference of UNESCO in 1973. In the same year, still as daily chairman of the Indonesian National Commission for UNESCO, he attended the meeting of the Southeast Asian National Commissions for UNESCO in Singapore. He also represented the Ministry of Education and Culture at a meeting of the SEAMEO English Language Centre in Singapore. During his time as secretary general, he conducted inspection visits to various European countries, including the United Kingdom, France, Monaco, Switzerland, the Netherlands, Belgium, West Germany, Italy, and Egypt. His tenure as secretary general ended with the appointment of Sutanto Wiryoprasonto on 28 April 1980.

On 1 September 1980, Umar became ambassador to Brazil, with concurrent accreditation to Peru and Bolivia. He presented his credentials to President João Figueiredo of Brazil on 18 November 1980, President Fernando Belaúnde of Peru on 24 March 1981, and to President Luis García Meza of Bolivia on 26 May 1981. He was later accredited for Colombia, and handed over his credentials to President Belisario Betancur on 18 January 1983. Aside from his tasks as ambassador, he was also sent to Paraguay in September 1981 to secure the country's support for Indonesia on the East Timor issue at the 1981 UN General Assembly. From August to September 1982, he served as a delegate for trade negotiations between Indonesia with Brazil and Colombia. On 10 October 1982, he represented Indonesia at the ceremony on the restoration of civilian rule in La Paz.

Umar's replacement was installed in December 1983, and on 10 January 1984 he was appointed as secretary general of the trade department. He served until 26 October 1988, and became the minister's advisor for tariffs and prices. Outside the government, he also served as advisor to the Aceh provincial government and state owned enterprises.

== Personal life ==
Umar Ali was married to Cut Arufah Nasir, the daughter of national hero Teuku Nyak Arief, on 9 February 1957. The couple has six children, including Tjut Rifameutia who became the dean of the University of Indonesia's psychology faculty. He was a Muslim, and performed the Hajj pilgrimage to Mecca in 1977. He died on 24 March 1992 at the Metropolitan Medical Center Hospital in Jakarta and was buried at the Sunan Giri public cemetery in East Jakarta.

== Awards ==
- Civil Servants' Long Service Medal, 1st Class (Indonesian: Satyalancana Karya Satya XXX Tahun) (2 May 1980)
- Medal of Ana Neri (Portuguese: Medalha Ana Neri) from the Sociedade Brasileira de Educação e Integração (11 January 1981)

== Bibliography ==
- Sumardi, S.; Sutjiatiningsih, Sri; Wahjuningsih; Masykuri (1984), Biografi Para Pejabat Utama Departemen Pendidikan dan Kebudayaan Sejak Masa Orde Baru (in Indonesian), Departemen Pendidikan dan Kebudayaan, Direktorat Sejarah dan Nilai Tradisional, Proyek Inventarisasi dan Dokumentasi Sejarah Nasional, pp. 64–71
- "Nama dan Peristiwa: Teuku Umar Ali (62) mantan Sekjen Pendidikan dan Kebudayaan (1972-1980) meninggal dunia di RS MMC, Selasa (24/3) pukul 14.25" [Name and Event: Teuku Umar Ali (62), former Secretary General of Education and Culture (1972-1980), died at MMC Hospital, Tuesday (March 24) at 2:25 PM], Kompas, p. 16, 25 March 1992
- "Dr Daoed Joesoef: Guru faktor penentu dalam pendidikan", Kompas, p. 6, 27 May 1980
- "Sekdjen Baru Dep. P&K", Kompas, p. 1, 1 July 1972
- "Alih tugas di Depdag", Kompas, p. 2, 27 October 1988
- "Nilai ekspor nonmigas 1988/89 harus dua kali 1983/84 *Teuku Umar Ali SE Sekjen Depdag", Kompas, p. 1, 11 January 1984
- "President Lantik Lima Duta Besar", Merdeka, 1 September 1980, archived from the original on 22 August 2019
- G. Dwipayana; Nazaruddin Sjamsuddin, eds. (2003), Jejak Langkah Pak Harto 16 Maret 1983 – 11 Maret 1988, Jakarta: Citra Kharisma Bunda, archived from the original on 22 August 2019
