= Margono Soekarjo =

Indonesian surgeon (1897–1970)

Dean of the University of Indonesia Faculty of Medicine
- In office 1960–1964
- Preceded by: Soedjono Djoened Poesponegoro
- Succeeded by: Sjahriar Rasad

Personal details
- Born: March 29, 1897 Sokaraja, Banyumas, Central Java, Dutch East Indies
- Died: October 8, 1970 (aged 73) Jakarta, Indonesia
- Spouse: Brand Soekarjo (m. 1926)
- Children: 1
- Parent: Wiroatmodjo (father)
- Education: School tot Opleiding van Inlandsche Artsen; University of Amsterdam

Margono Soekarjo (29 March 1897 – 8 October 1970) was an Indonesian surgeon and a professor of surgery at the University of Indonesia. He was the dean of the university's medicine faculty from 1960 to 1964. He was known for his role in pioneering cardiac surgery in Indonesia.

== Early life ==
Soekarjo was born on 29 March 1897 in Sokaraja, Banyumas, as Mas Soekarjo. His father, Wiroatmodjo, was a bank employee in Purwokerto. He had two brothers and three sisters.

As the child of a Javanese aristocrat, Soekarjo had access to European education. He was educated at the Dutch-speaking Europeesche Lagere School from 1904 to 1910. Soekarjo entered the School tot Opleiding van Inlandsche Artsen in 1910 and graduated from the school as an indische arts (native Indonesian physician) on 8 May 1920.

== Career ==
In June 1920, Soekarjo, along with Wilhelmus Zakaria Johannes and Tengku Mansur was assigned to the Nederlandsch-Indische Artsen School in Surabaya as an assistant surgeon. After serving for seven years in Surabaya, Soekarjo was reassigned to the Centrale Burgerlijke Ziekeninrichting te Batavia (now the Dr. Cipto Mangunkusumo Hospital) for a few months. He departed to Amsterdam alongside his wife in August that year. He studied surgery at the University of Amsterdam. After two years, he was elevated to a full arts (physician) making him equivalent to his Dutch counterparts. From 1929 to 1930, Soekarjo visited surgical facilities in Paris, Düsseldorf, Halle, Prague, and Vienna.

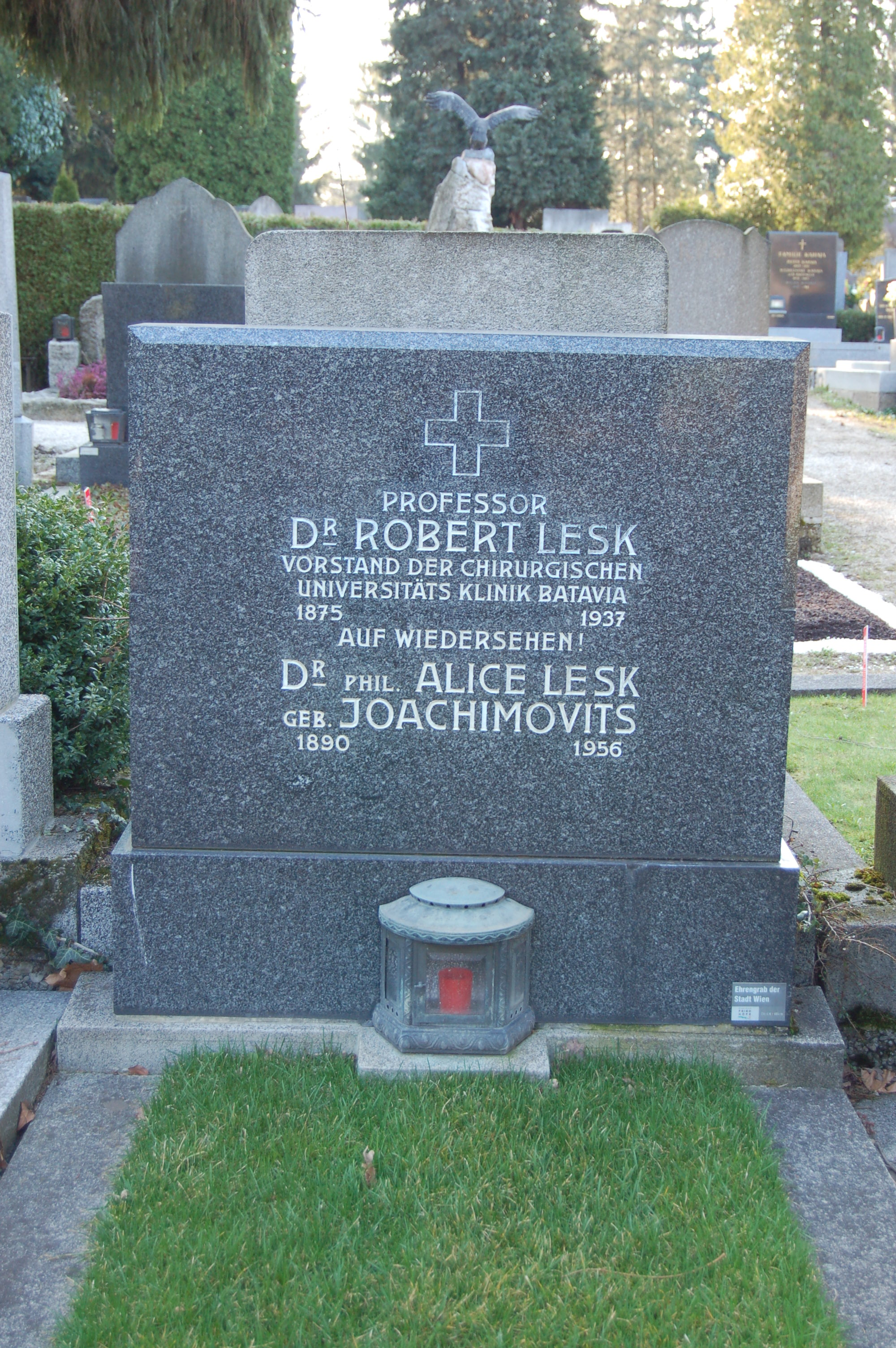
Grave of Robert Lesk, Soekarjo's mentor.

Upon returning to Indonesia in March 1930, Soekarjo was assigned as assistant surgeon to Robert Lesk at the Geneeskundige Hoogeschool te Batavia with the rank of waarnemend gouvernements-arts (acting government physician). Soekarjo respected Lesk so much that he displayed Lesk’s portrait prominently in his workroom.

A year later, in June 1931 Soekarjo was transferred to the Semarang Central Hospital, where he became the deputy chief of the hospital's surgery section. His appointment in Semarang ended in January 1932 and he returned to the Centrale Burgerlijke Ziekeninrichting te Batavia. In October that year, Soekarjo became a substitute professor at the Nederlandsch-Indische Artsen School, replacing Tj. Wieberdink who was in sick leave. About four months later, on 2 December, Soekarjo received a permanent commission as a surgeon at the Semarang Central Hospital. His medical rank was promoted to a gouvernements-arts (government physician). Soekarjo then became chief of the hospital's surgery section in 1933, retaining his position until the Japanese occupation of the Dutch East Indies in 1944.

After heading the surgery section for eleven years, Soekarjo became the director of the Semarang Central Hospital, replacing Buntaran Martoatmodjo. As the hospital's director, Soekarjo protected physicians and hospital employees from Japanese soldiers. After the Proclamation of Indonesian Independence, the Semarang Central Hospital was renamed by the Indonesian authorities to the Central People's Hospital (Purusara, Pusat Rumah Sakit Rakyat), and Soekarjo retained his leadership of the hospital. He coordinated coordinating efforts to treat wounded Indonesian soldiers during the Battle of Semarang and supplied medicine and provisions to the Indonesian Army. In the midst of the war, Soekarjo and Central Java governor Wongsonegoro was taken hostage by the Japanese forces and was detained at the Bulu and Jatingaleh prison in Semarang. In 1948, Soekarjo conducted the first closed mitral stenosis surgery in Indonesia.

After the Proclamation of Indonesian Independence, Indonesian academicians established the Indonesian Higher Education Center, which was the counterpart to the Dutch-established Universiteit van Indonesië. Soekarjo was appointed as a professor of surgery at the Indonesian Higher Education Center on 25 January 1947. Aside from giving lectures at the university, he also taught at medical schools in West Germany, Bulgaria, and Hungary. On 1 January 1949, the Dutch authorities appointed Soekarjo as a professor in surgery and orthopaedics at the Universiteit van Indonesië. He officially accepted his appointment with an inaugural speech on 29 March.

After the recognition of Indonesia's sovereignty in 1949, the Indonesian Higher Education Center and the Universiteit van Indonesië were merged to form the University of Indonesia. Soekarjo became the head of the surgical department in the university and the Jakarta Central Hospital. In 1954, Soekarjo gathered Indonesian surgeons to form the Union of Indonesian Surgeons. Soekarjo became its inaugural chairman, with Salim and Abdul Azis Saleh as his deputy.

In 1956, Soekarjo pioneered the first cardiac surgery in Indonesia at the Jakarta Central Hospital. Out of the 20 patients that were operated, 17 patients successfully recovered, and 3 patients died. The next year, Soekarjo, in his capacity as the head of the surgery department, led the historic separation surgery of the conjoined twins Karina-Karini. When the operation commenced, Soekarjo and the other senior surgeons faced a challenging medical scenario: the twins were joined at the abdomen, and their livers were fused over a diameter of about 5 centimeters. Despite this challenge, Soekarjo and his team managed to separate the twins safely. Once the conjoined livers were divided, each baby was placed on a separate operating table. Soekarjo, alongside future medicine dean Djamaloeddin, proceeded with the post-separation surgery on one of the babies, while the remaining surgeons, Utama and Ramli, operated on the other.

He became the dean of the University of Indonesia's medicine faculty from 1960 until his retirement in 1964. In 1967, the Union of Indonesian Surgeons was re-established as the Indonesia Surgical Association, and Soekarjo became its inaugural honorary member. He received an honorary golden scalpel from the organization.

== Personal life ==
Mas Soekarjo officially changed his name to Margono Soekarjo in February 1936 after previously adopting Soekarjo as his family name in December 1931. He was married to Brand Soekarjo, a dermatologist from Austria, in 1926. The couple's only son, Roberto Soekarjo, was named after Soekarjo's surgeon-mentor Robert Lesk.

Soekarjo died at the Dr. Cipto Mangunkusumo Hospital on the night of 8 October 1970 due to blood clotting disorder. His body was interred at the Menteng Pulo Cemetery the next day. The central hospital in Banyumas was named after him in 1990.
