= Asri Rasad =

Indonesian physician and professor (1926–2010)

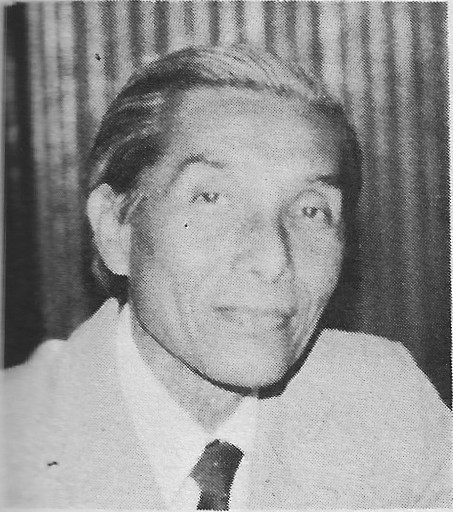
- Portrait, c. 1982

Dean of the University of Indonesia Faculty of Medicine
- In office 10 March 1984 – 11 September 1990
- Preceded by: Ratwita Gandasoebrata
- Succeeded by: Mardiono Marsetio

Personal details
- Born: 30 October 1926 Pariaman, West Sumatra, Dutch East Indies
- Died: 14 July 2010 (aged 83) Jakarta, Indonesia
- Spouse: Lifanur Asri Rasad
- Children: 3
- Education: University of Indonesia (dr., Prof.); University of California, Berkeley (M.Sc.); University of Tennessee (Ph.D.)

Asri Rasad (30 October 1926 – 14 July 2010) was an Indonesian physician and a professor of biochemistry at the University of Indonesia. He was the dean of the University of Indonesia's Faculty of Medicine from 1984 to 1990 and Rector of the YARSI University from 1990 to 2005. He also held a number of memberships in national academic agencies, such as the National Research Council, the National Accreditation Council, and the Council of Higher Education.

== Early life and education ==
Asri Rasad was born in Pariaman, West Sumatra, on 30 October 1926. His childhood was shaped by a strong Minangkabau cultural heritage and a family environment that emphasized independence and self-sufficiency. From a young age, Rasad was prepared by his mother for the challenges of migration and higher education, learning essential life skills such as cooking, sewing, and ironing before leaving for Java to pursue further studies.

Rasad’s educational journey began at the Hollandsch-Inlandsche School in 1939, followed by the Meer Uitgebreid Lager Onderwijs in 1942. During the Japanese occupation of the Dutch East Indies, he attended the military supervised high school in Jakarta (Japanese: 中等教学校, romanized: Chūtō Kyō Gakkō) from 1943 to 1945. Following the proclamation of Indonesian Independence in 1945 that marked the end of Japanese occupation, he served as a liaison officer in the fledgling Indonesian army, acting as a crucial link between the Indonesian military headquarters in Yogyakarta under the command of Mas Tirtodarmo Haryono and the Allied Forces Headquarters in Jakarta. He completed his final high school exam at an Indonesian-owned high school in Jakarta in 1948.

Upon finishing high school, Rasad studied medicine at the Indonesian Higher Education Center (Indonesian: Balai Perguruan Tinggi Republik Indonesia). He completed his 2nd candidate exam in 1952, two years after the Indonesian Higher Education Center merged with the Dutch-owned Universiteit van Indonesië to form the University of Indonesia (UI). During his college studies, Rasad became a schoolteacher and taught at the API (Angkatan Pemuda Indonesia) middle school and high school, the Budi Utomo High School, and the State Chemical Analyst School. Despite lacking formal pedagogical training, Rasad’s natural aptitude for teaching and his Minangkabau background—often associated with linguistic proficiency—enabled him to excel, particularly in teaching Indonesian language.

Prior to receiving his medical degree, in 1951 Rasad had already become an assistant lecturer at the biochemical department in UI's medical faculty. A year later, upon finishing his 2nd candidate exam, Rasad became a civil servant and was promoted to a junior lecturer in the faculty. He completed his medical exam (arts-examen) in June 1955 and became a lecturer in the biochemical department. He finally completed his medical education in 1957 after passing the final medical examination in November 1956.

Rasad continued his studies at the University of California, Berkeley, earning a Master of Science degree from the University of California, Berkeley, and the School of Biological Sciences, University of Tennessee, Memphis from 1958 to 1959. He became a visiting scientist at the Oak Ridge Institute of Nuclear Studies in Oak Ridge, Tennessee for a year before returning to Indonesia. He in the WHO International Training in Laboratory and Field Methods of Human Population Genetics in India in 1963. Rasad completed his Ph.D. at the School of Basic Medical Science at the University of Tennessee from 1968 to 1971 with a thesis titled Effect of Continuous Low Level Irradiation Upon Hemoglobin Biosynthesis in Mice and was followed by a postdoctoral fellowship at the same institution from 1971 to 1973.

== Academic career ==
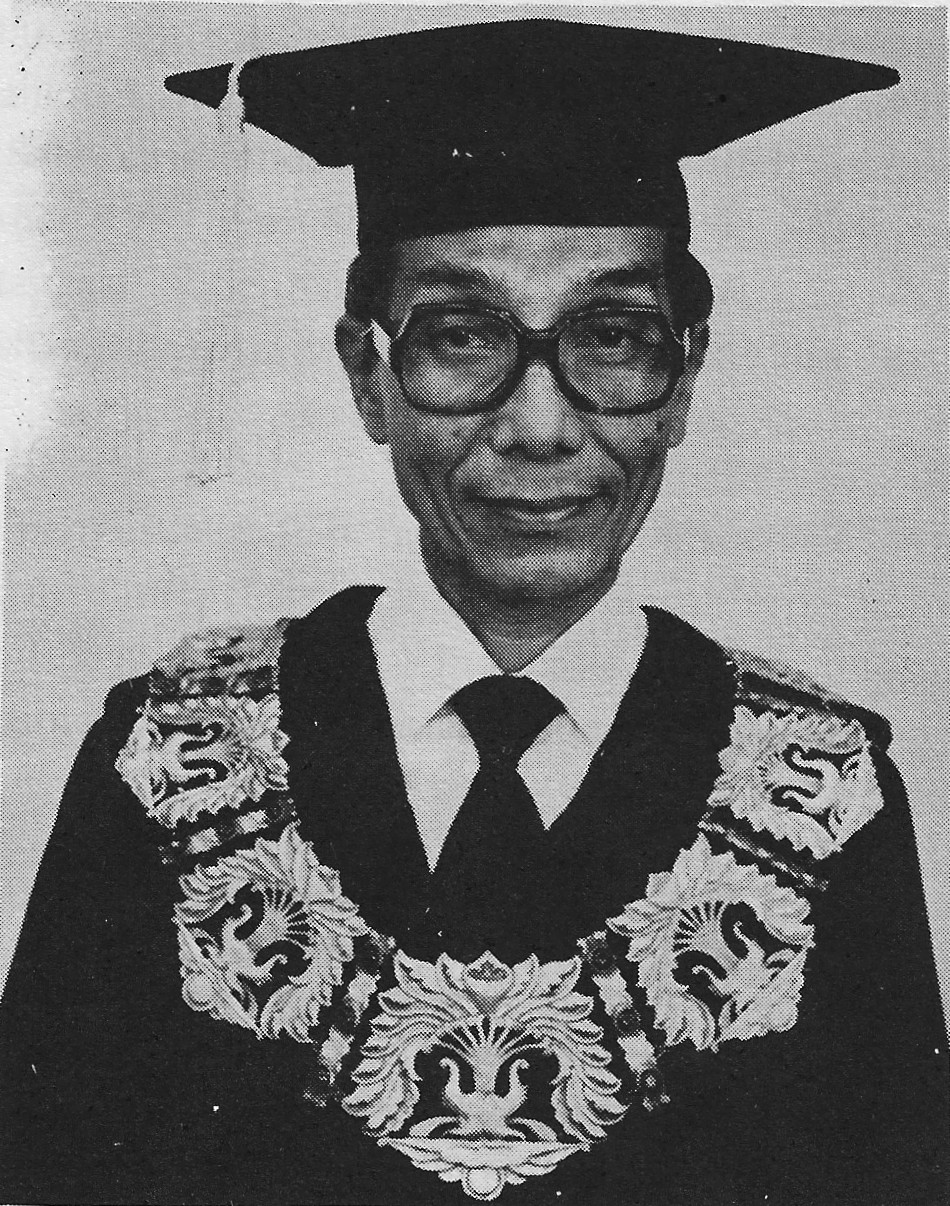
Rasad wearing his academic robe as faculty dean.

Upon receiving his master's degree, Rasad was promoted to senior lecturer at the faculty, and later as the head of the biochemistry department. Rasad was appointed as a full professor in biochemistry in 1975, with his inaugural speech as full professor being read on 9 August 1975. Two years later, Rasad was appointed by dean Ratwita Gandasoebrata to serve as his deputy for academic affairs. His leadership culminated in his appointment as Dean of the Faculty of Medicine from 1984 to 1990, where he played a pivotal role in shaping medical education and research in Indonesia. Upon retiring, Rasad became the rector of the YARSI University, serving in the position until 2005.

Aside from his involvement in academic administration, Rasad has been a mentor and academic advisor to numerous doctoral and postgraduate students, serving as a promoter for ten doctoral candidates, co-promoter for six, and supervisor for seven master’s students. He has been actively involved in various professional organizations, both nationally and internationally. These include the Indonesian Medical Association (IDI), the Indonesian Biochemistry Association, the Indonesian Association of Nuclear Medicine and Biology, the Indonesian Clinical Chemistry Association, and the Indonesian Muslim Intellectuals Association (ICMI). He has also held leadership roles in the Indonesian Cancer Foundation and international scientific societies such as Sigma Xi and the New York Academy of Sciences.

Rasad also participated in numerous governmental and non-governmental committees. He chaired the Permanent Committee for the Evaluation of Foreign University Degrees in the Directorate General of Higher Education, National Accreditation Board for Higher Education, led teams for the development of Islamic textbooks in biology, nutrition, obstetrics, and gynecology, and served on the Ethics Council of the Indonesian Medical Association and the Health Commission of the Indonesian Ulema Council (MUI). In particular, Rasad was the chairman for welfare affairs of the Central Jakarta branch of the Indonesian Medical Association and a member of the funding section of the alumni association of the University of Indonesia's medicine faculty.

== Awards ==
In recognition of his service, Rasad has received a number of awards, including:

- Civil Servants' Long Service Medal, 1st Class (Indonesian: Satyalancana Karya Satya XXX Tahun) (1983)
- Star of Service, 1st Class (Indonesian: Bintang Jasa Utama) (7 August 1995)

== Personal life ==
Asri was married to Rini Naryati and has three daughters.
