= Adhyatma =

Indonesian public health official and health minister

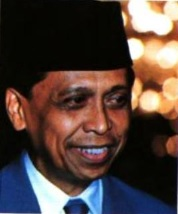

Minister of Health
- In office 23 March 1988 – 11 March 1993
- President: Suharto
- Preceded by: Suwardjono Surjaningrat
- Succeeded by: Sujudi

Personal details
- Born: 25 May 1932 Semarang, Central Java, Dutch East Indies
- Died: 2 December 1999 (aged 67) Jakarta, Indonesia
- Spouse: Siti Fatimah
- Children: 3
- Education: Universitas Indonesia; University of Berkeley
- Occupation: Doctor

M. Adhyatma (25 May 1932 – 2 December 1999) was an Indonesian public health official who served as the country's minister of health between 1988 and 1993.

== Early life and education ==
Adhyatma received a Master of Public Health degree from the University of California, Berkeley, School of Public Health in 1974.

== Health Minister ==
As minister, he prioritized addressing the high cost of drugs and mandated the use of generic drugs at government-operated healthcare facilities. His policies reduced drug costs by 10–15 percent and were met with resistance by the pharmaceutical industry. He was praised for Indonesia's handling of the HIV/AIDS epidemic because the health ministry regularly published case counts, whereas other Asian countries often hid those figures.
