= Soepojo Padmodipoetro =

Indonesian academic and diplomat (1922–1997)

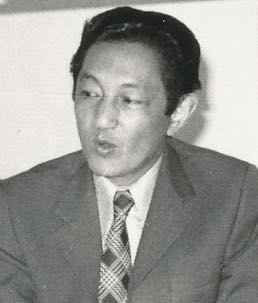

Permanent Delegate of Indonesia to UNESCO
- In office 1972 – August 1977
- President: Suharto
- Preceded by: office established
- Succeeded by: Partomo Alibazah

Secretary General of the Department of Education and Culture
- In office 1 September 1968 – 3 July 1972
- Preceded by: Soemantri Hardjoprakoso
- Succeeded by: Teuku Umar Ali

Chairman of the Presidium of the Gadjah Mada University
- In office 1967 – 28 September 1968
- Preceded by: Nazir Alwi (acting rector)
- Succeeded by: Soeroso Prawirodihardjo (acting rector)

Personal details
- Born: December 22, 1922 Banyumas, East Java, Dutch East Indies
- Died: April 15, 1997 (aged 74) Jakarta, Indonesia
- Spouse: Sri Patonah
- Education: University of Gadjah Mada (Drs.); University of Minnesota (M.Sc.)

Military service
- Allegiance: Indonesia
- Branch/service: Indonesian Army
- Years of service: 1945 – 1950
- Rank: Sergeant

Soepojo Padmodipoetro (22 December 1922 – 15 April 1997) was an Indonesian academic and diplomat. He served as the Chairman of the Presidium of the Gadjah Mada University from 1967 to 1968, Secretary General of the Department of Education and Culture from 1968 to 1972, and as the permanent delegate of Indonesia to the United Nations Educational, Scientific and Cultural Organization from 1972 to 1977.

== Early life and career ==
Born on 22 December 1922 in Banyumas, Central Java, Soepojo completed his education at the Hollandsch Inlandsche Kweekschool in 1943. He then began teaching at an elementary school in Bandung from 1943 to 1945. He returned to Banyumas after British forces occupied the elementary school. He joined the fledgling Indonesian Army during the Indonesian National Revolution and was enlisted as a sergeant until 1950. In the midst of war, Soepojo continued his education at the advanced teacher's school until the third grade, and received his high school diploma from a state high school.

Following the end of the war, Soepojo resigned from the army and began studying economics at the-then newly established Gadjah Mada University (UGM) in 1950. During his studies, Soepojo joined the Union of Indonesian Students, and also taught at the Taman Ksatria Junior High School from 1951 until 1953 and at the Padmanaba High School in 1954. Herman Cornelis Yohannes, one of his former high school students, described him as a "sympathetic and fun" teacher.

He received his baccalaureate (sarjana muda, lit. 'young bachelor', equivalent to an associate degree in the Western higher education system) in economics in 1954. In the midst of continuing his studies for a full bachelor's degree in UGM, the university sent him to the University of Minnesota to study state finance. He received his Master of Arts from the University of Minnesota in 1962 and a doctorandus in economics in 1965.

== Academic administrator ==
Shortly after receiving his Master of Arts, Soepojo became the dean of UGM's economic faculty from 1962 until 1964. He became the faculty's dean while still being registered as an active undergraduate student of the faculty. Afterwards, he became the first deputy rector, responsible for administrative and financial affairs under rector Herman Johannes and Nazir Alwi. Upon the resignation of Nazir Alwi from the office of rector, the rectorate was transformed into a five-member presidium body, with each member responsible for different affairs. Soepojo became a member of the presidium. With the backing of Central Java military commander, Surono Reksodimedjo (his former elementary school classmate), Soepojo was selected as the chairman of the presidium. During his one-year tenure as the chairman of the presidium, there were minuscule developments in UGM due to the political turmoil that was caused by the aftermath of the 30 September Movement.

The presidium had several shortcomings. Soepojo himself was not a doctor, meaning he could not attend UGM's senate meetings, despite being the highest administrator of the university. Furthermore, none of the presidium members were responsible for student affairs, which caused student affairs in UGM to be unsupervised during his tenure. This condition urged UGM's student council and senate to appoint a rector, whom they agreed on Soeroso Prawirohardjo. The presidium was dissolved after Soepojo was replaced by Soeroso on 28 September 1968.

After serving as the chairman of the university's presidium, Soepojo was appointed by education minister Mashuri Saleh as the Secretary General of the Department of Education and Culture on 1 September 1968. Soepojo held this position until 3 July 1972, when he was replaced by Teuku Umar Ali from the University of Indonesia. He served as the permanent delegate of Indonesia to UNESCO with the rank of ambassadors from 1972 until August 1977. He presented his credentials as permanent delegate to director general René Maheu on 8 September 1972. He then became an expert staff to the Minister of Education and Culture Daoed Joesoef and Chair of the Indonesian Committee for UNESCO. He retired in 1987 and resided in Jakarta.

After his retirement, Soepojo continued to serve a number of government positions. He continued to lead the Indonesian Committee for UNESCO and became a member of the National Education Advisory Board since 8 January 1990. He also assumed office as the chairman of the supervisory board of the state-owned Balai Pustaka publishing company since 11 May 1993.

== Personal life ==
Soepojo was married to Sri Patonah. Soepojo died on 15 April 1997 and was buried at the Taman Kusir Public Cemetery.
