= Nugroho Notosusanto =

Indonesian historian and politician (1930–1985)

Prof. Brig. Gen. Rd. Panji Nugroho Notosusanto
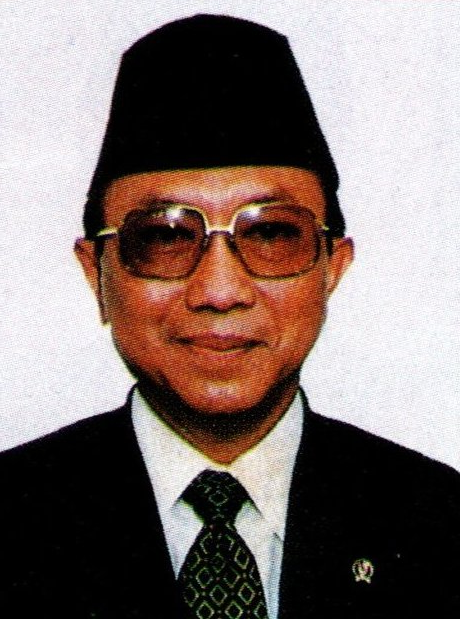
- Notosusanto in 1985

19th Minister of Education and Culture
- In office 19 March 1983 – 3 June 1985
- President: Suharto
- Preceded by: Daoed Joesoef
- Succeeded by: Fuad Hassan

Rector of the University of Indonesia
- In office 15 January 1982 – 3 June 1985
- Preceded by: Mahar Mardjono
- Succeeded by: W. A. F. J. Tumbelaka (acting); Sujudi

Personal details
- Born: 15 July 1930 Rembang, Central Java, Dutch East Indies
- Died: 3 June 1985 (aged 54) Jakarta, Indonesia
- Resting place: Kalibata Heroes' Cemetery
- Spouse: Irma Sawitri Ramelan (m. 1960)
- Children: 3
- Education: University of Indonesia
- Profession: Historian
- Cabinet: Fourth Development

Military service
- Allegiance: Indonesia
- Branch/service: Indonesian Army
- Years of service: 1945–1949 (active); 1964–1985 (civilian)
- Rank: Brigadier general (titular)
- Battles/wars: Indonesian War of Independence

Brigadier General Raden Panji Nugroho Notosusanto (15 July 1930 – 3 June 1985) was an Indonesian short story writer turned military historian who served as a professor of history at the University of Indonesia. Born to a noble family in Central Java, he exhibited a high degree of nationalism from a young age. During the Indonesian National Revolution from 1945 to 1949, he saw active service as a member of the Student Army, working reconnaissance. Despite wanting to remain in the military, under the influence of his father he continued his education, eventually enrolling in the faculty of literature at the University of Indonesia. During the 1950s he wrote extensively and was active in numerous political and academic groups, finally graduating with a degree in history in 1958.

After a failed attempt to study at the University of London, in the early 1960s Notosusanto – by then a lecturer – was contacted by General Abdul Haris Nasution and tasked with writing a history of the revolution and Madiun Affair. By 1964 he had become head of the Indonesian Army's history division, holding an honorary rank. Continuing to teach, he wrote extensively on the revolution and other military events, including the first book on the 30 September Movement of 1965. His work producing official history on behalf of the authoritarian New Order regime led to his being regarded with contempt by other Indonesian historians. Between 1983 and his death Notosusanto served concurrently as rector of the University of Indonesia and Minister of Education and Culture.

== Early life ==
Nugroho Notosusanto was born in Rembang, Central Java, Dutch East Indies, on 15 July 1930, the first of three children born to R.P. Notosusanto, a professor of Islamic law and later one of the founders of Gadjah Mada University, and his wife. The family was well connected, and several of Nugroho Notosusanto's relatives were bupati (regents); his grandfather, Notomidjojo, was likewise connected to the nobility. While still a child Nugroho Notosusanto began writing short stories; his father later recalled that they were filled with themes of struggle and nationalism. Another of Notosusanto's relatives, Budi Darma, later recalled that he had always stood at attention, "like a soldier", when the future national anthem "Indonesia Raya" was played.

Nugroho Notosusanto began his elementary education at a Dutch-run school in Malang, East Java, in 1937. The following year he transferred to a school for native Indonesians in the colony's capital at Batavia (now Jakarta), graduating in 1942. He completed his junior high school studies in Pati.

During the Indonesian National Revolution from 1945 to 1949 Nugroho Notosusanto's family lived in the temporary national capital at Yogyakarta so that his father could work for the Ministry of Law. The younger Notosusanto fought for the revolutionaries. He first joined the 17th Brigade of the Student Army (Tentara Pelajar), later transferring to the People's Security Army (Tentara Keamanan Rakjat). During this period he exclusively did reconnaissance and often slept at the homes of local villagers. Historian Katherine McGregor suggests that this influenced his later short stories, which took humanist themes.

== Post-revolution ==
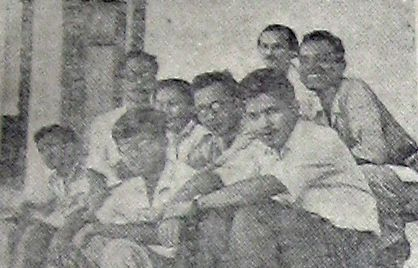
Notosusanto (centre) with several contemporary writers, including Ajip Rosidi

After the end of the revolution, Notosusanto was given a choice between resuming his studies or going to Breda in the Netherlands for further military training. Influenced by his father's disapproval of the military, he finished his senior high school education, despite wanting to continue with the army. After graduating senior high school in 1951, he immediately enrolled with the faculty of literature at the University of Indonesia (Universitas Indonesia, or UI). However, he continued to resent the older generation and political leadership.

During the 1950s Notosusanto wrote extensively, focusing on essays but also writing poems and, later, short stories; the last of his creative works were written around 1956. He published four short story anthologies between 1958 and 1963. The first, Hudjan Kepagian (Morning Rain), consisted of six short stories. It dealt with the struggle against the Dutch colonists during the revolution. His second anthology, Tiga Kota (Three Cities), was published the following year and followed events in three cities: Rembang, Yogyakarta, and Jakarta. The others, and his numerous stories which were published outside of anthologies, mostly dealt with the war and the positive effects of revolution.

Aside from his writing, Notosusanto was active in student and political organisations, the student press, and academic conferences. With other students he picketed the British and French embassies in Jakarta, supporting independence for Egypt and Algeria. He also travelled extensively, visiting Malaysia, Singapore, the Philippines, Japan, and the US on academic sorties. He completed his bachelour's degree in history from UI in 1958, becoming a lecturer at UI after graduation. On 12 December 1960, he married Irma Sawitri Ramelan (better known as Lilik). Together they had three children: Indrya Smita, Inggita Sukma, and Narottama.

== Historian ==
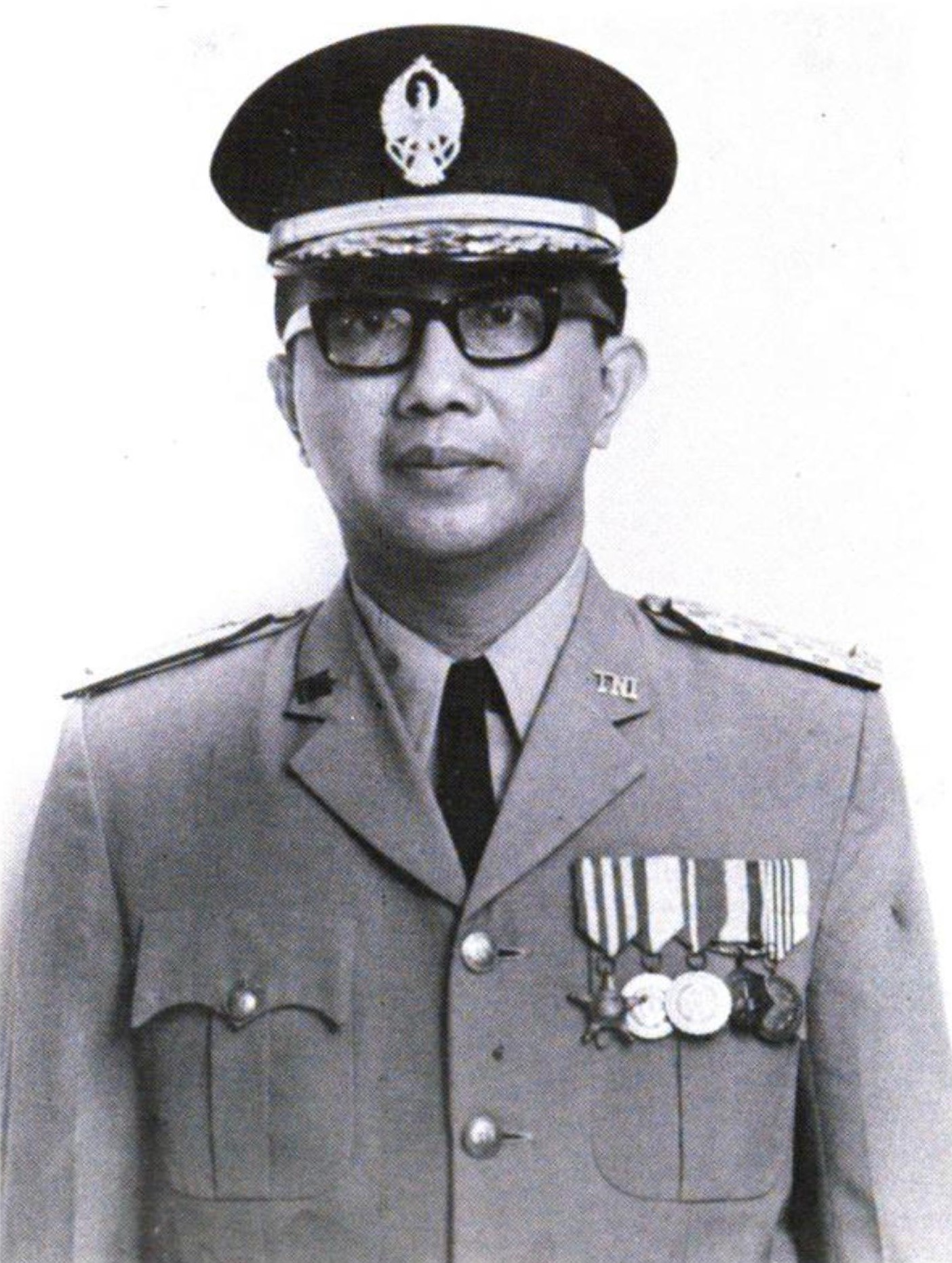
Nugroho Notosusanto as Head of the History Center of the Indonesian National Armed Forces

By the early 1960s, Notosusanto had abandoned his literary career, focusing instead on history. In 1960 he received a scholarship from the Rockefeller Foundation to study at the School of Oriental and African Studies at the University of London, England. He dropped out in 1961 and returned to Indonesia in 1962. Around this time he was recruited by General Abdul Haris Nasution to provide a version of the revolution amenable to the Indonesian Army and counter a Communist Party of Indonesia-backed history which ignored the Madiun Affair of 1948. In 1964 he was chosen as head of the Department of Military History. He also worked as a lecturer at UI.

During the mid-to-late 1960s Notosusanto wrote extensively on the military history of Indonesia, including a book on Supriyadi's anti-Japanese rebellion in 1945 and the Battle of Surabaya. In 1963 he was appointed to the committee deciding on the content of the Monas Museum to be built in the base of the National Monument in the centre of Jakarta. His 1968 book on the 30 September Movement coup in 1965, written in collaboration with Ismail Saleh and entitled The Coup Attempt of the 30 September Movement in Indonesia, was the first on the subject to be published and was the "official version" of the incident. It was later used as the basis for the pro-Suharto film Pengkhianatan G30S/PKI (Treachery of G30S/PKI; 1984), for which Notosusanto received a writing credit. He subsequently wrote books accentuating the role of the military in Indonesia's fight for independence.

Sometime after 1968 Notosusanto conceived of Satria Mandala Museum in Jakarta as a modern museum showcasing the military's role in the country's history. The museum, modeled after the Australian War Memorial in Canberra and the Museo Nacional de Historia in Mexico City, Mexico, opened in 1972 and contained numerous dioramas. In a later pamphlet Notosusanto wrote that dioramas were necessary as "the habit of reading is still developing ... [thus] historical visualisation remains an effective way to express the identity of ABRI". In existing museums he revised the dioramas to better suit the needs of the New Order government. In 1969 he was promoted to head the Monas Museum committee.

During this period Notosusanto continued to teach, although he also became involved with administrative work at UI. He served as assistant dean at the university's faculty of literature between 1963 and 1964, later serving as assistant rector from 1964 to 1967. After writing his thesis on "The Peta Army During the Japanese Occupation in Indonesia", Notosusanto received his doctorate in 1977 from UI; the thesis was translated into Indonesian and published in 1979 by Gramedia. Two years later he was made a full professor.

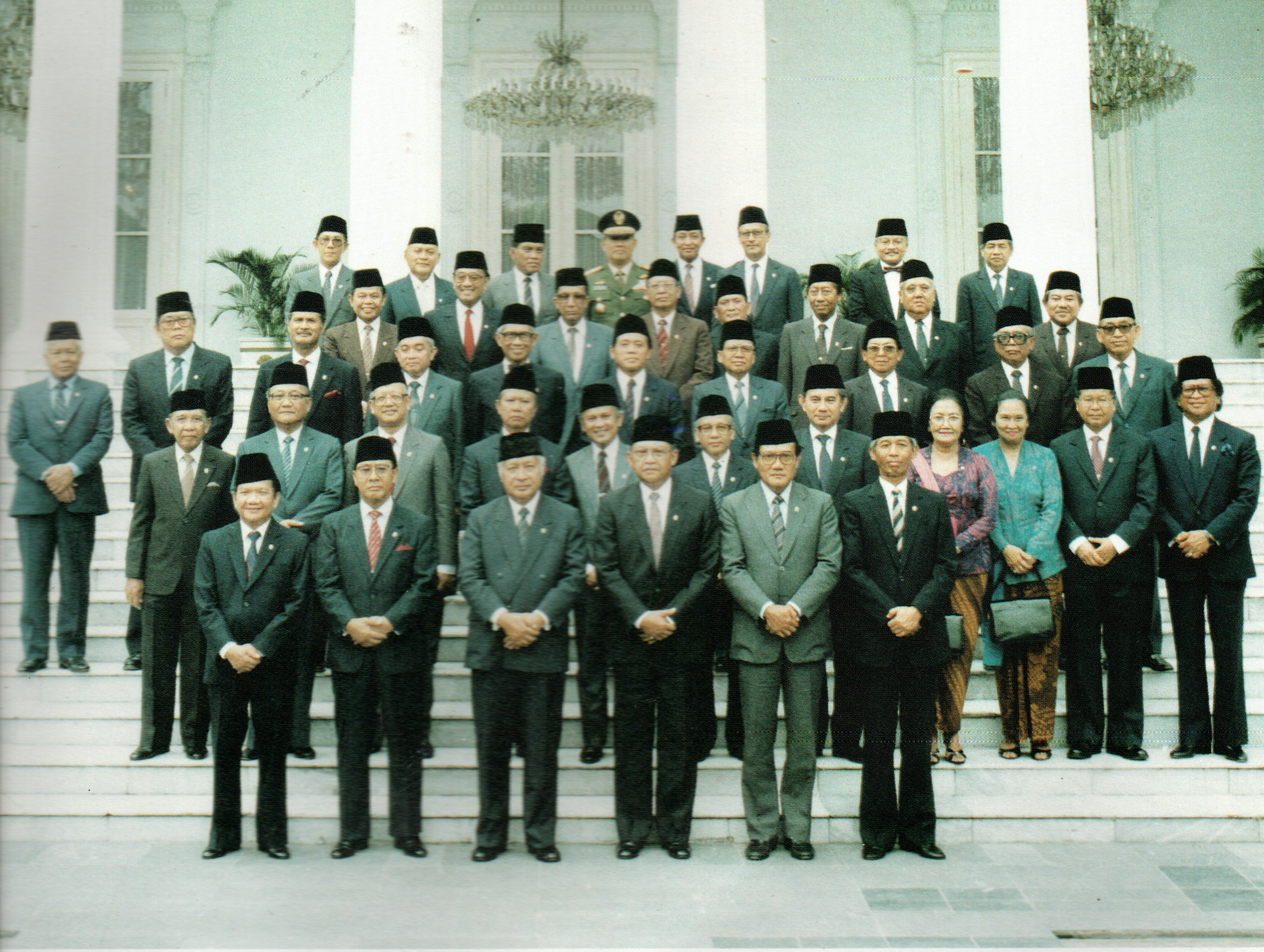
The Fourth Development Cabinet

Notosusanto was made a member of the Fourth Development Cabinet when it was formed on 16 March 1983, replacing outgoing minister Daud Jusuf and taking office three days later. During his two years as minister, he worked on several programs, including compulsory education and student selection systems. He also instituted a new curriculum, replacing the one that had been in use since 1975 and promoting the humanities. Concurrently with his work as Minister of Education and Culture, Notosusanto served as rector of UI; students disapproved of his selection, considering him a military official sent to limit their freedom. He died at his Jakarta home on 3 June 1985 after suffering a cerebral hemorrhage and was buried at Kalibata Heroes' Cemetery. At the time, he was a titular brigadier general.

== Legacy ==
For his military and civilian service, Notosusanto received several awards from the Indonesian government, including the Bintang Dharma, Bintang Gerilya, Bintang Yudha, Dharma Naraya, and Satyalencana Penegak. McGregor describes him as "the central propagandist of the New Order regime", writing that he worked "tirelessly" to support the military. She argues that he controlled a "cult of personality" built around President Suharto, giving the reorganisation of history museums as an example. According to McGregor, Notosusanto relegated the country's first president, Sukarno, to a background role while he "inserted Suharto, together with other military men, into new places", legitimising the New Order government. He faced widespread criticism throughout his life from Indonesian historians and was alluded to by a member of the military as "a historian who pretends to be a military man", although he enjoyed travelling overseas as his titular military rank meant he could wear a uniform.

== Selected bibliography ==
=== Short story collections ===
- Notosusanto, Nugroho (1958). Hudjan Kepagian [Morning Rain]. Jakarta: Balai Pustaka. OCLC 63840742.
- Notosusanto, Nugroho (1959). Tiga Kota [Three Cities]. Jakarta: Balai Pustaka. OCLC 61627011.
- Notosusanto, Nugroho (1961). Rasa Sajange [This Love]. Jakarta: Pembangunan. OCLC 611193440.
- Notosusanto, Nugroho (1963). Hidjau Tanahku, Hidjau Badjuku [Green of My Land, Green of My Shirt]. Jakarta: Balai Pustaka. OCLC 64096491.

=== Historical works ===
- Notosusanto, Nugroho; Saleh, Ismail (1971). The Coup Attempt of the September 30 Movement in Indonesia. Jakarta: Pembimbing Masa. OCLC 8389745.
- Notosusanto, Nugroho (1971). The Peta Army in Indonesia, 1943-1945. Jakarta: Centre for Armed Forces History. OCLC 533393.
- Notosusanto, Nugroho (1974). The Revolt Against the Japanese of a Peta Battalion in Blitar, February 14, 1945. Jakarta: Centre for Armed Forces History. OCLC 1604032.
- Notosusanto, Nugroho (1975). The National Struggle and the Armed Forces in Indonesia. Jakarta: Centre for Armed Forces History. OCLC 5775078.

== Works cited ==
- Heryanto, Ariel (2006). State Terrorism and Political Identity in Indonesia: Fatally Belonging. New York: Routledge. ISBN 978-0-415-37152-0.
- "Kredit Pengkhianatan G-30-S PKI" [Credits for Pengkhianatan G-30-S PKI]. filmindonesia.or.id (in Indonesian). Jakarta: Konfiden Foundation. Archived from the original on 31 March 2014.
- McGregor, Kate (2001). "A soldier's historian". Inside Indonesia (68 ed.).
- McGregor, Katharine E. (April 2003). "Representing the Indonesian Past: The National Monument History Museum from Guided Democracy to the New Order" (PDF). Indonesia. 75 (75): 91–122. JSTOR 3351309.
- McGregor, Katharine E. (2005). "Nugroho Notosusanto: The Legacy of a Historian in the Service of an Authoritarian Regime". In Zurbuchen, Mary S. (ed.). Beginning to remember: The Past in the Indonesian Present. Singapore University Press. pp. 209–232. ISBN 9971-69-303-8.
- McGregor, Katharine E (2007). History in Uniform: Military Ideology and the Construction of Indonesia's Past. Honolulu: University of Honolulu Press. ISBN 978-9971-69-360-2.
- "Nugroho Notosusanto" (in Indonesian). Jakarta: Ministry of Education and Culture. Archived from the original on 11 April 2013.
- "Nugroho Notosusanto" (in Indonesian). Taman Ismail Marzuki. Archived from the original on 10 June 2022.
- Suprapto, Bibit (1985). Perkembangan Kabinet dan Pemerintahan Indonesia [Development of Indonesian Cabinets and Government] (in Indonesian). Jakarta: Ghalia. OCLC 13555282.
- "Prof. Dr. Nugroho Notosusanto" (in Indonesian). Presidential Library of Indonesia.
- "Tidak Sekadar Buat Makan" [Not Only for Eating]. Tempo (in Indonesian). 10 November 1973. Archived from the original on 4 March 2016.
