= W. A. F. J. Tumbelaka =

Indonesian physician and academician

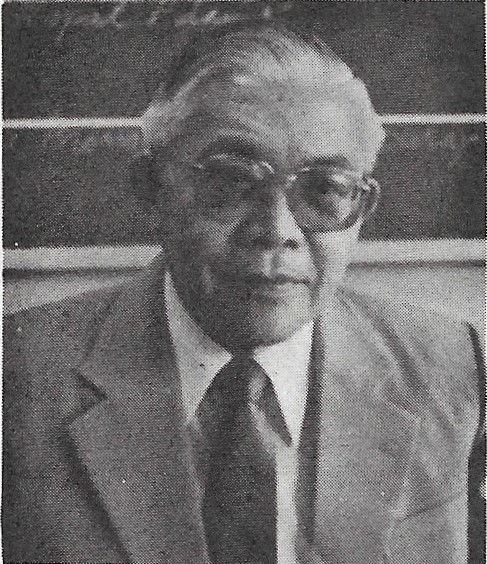

Rector of the University of Indonesia
- Acting
- In office 3 June 1985 – 15 January 1986
- Preceded by: Nugroho Notosusanto
- Succeeded by: Sujudi

Deputy Rector for Academic Affairs of the University of Indonesia
- In office 1982 – 6 March 1986
- Preceded by: Sujudi
- Succeeded by: Rustam Didong

Dean of the University of Indonesia Faculty of Medicine
- Acting
- In office August 1976 – 1977
- Preceded by: Djamaloeddin
- Succeeded by: Ratwita Gandasoebrata

Personal details
- Born: 24 April 1920 Kotamobagu, Dutch East Indies
- Died: 11 September 2012 (aged 92) Jakarta, Indonesia
- Education: University of Amsterdam; University of Indonesia

Willem "Wim" Alexander Frederick Joseph Tumbelaka (24 April 1920 – 11 September 2012) was an Indonesian physician and academician. He worked in the Faculty of Medicine of the University of Indonesia (UI) and became the acting dean of the faculty for several months in 1976. He also became the acting rector of the university from 1985 until 1986.

== Early life and education ==
Tumbelaka was born on 24 April 1920 in Kotamobagu, Sulawesi, as the second child of ten children. His father, Isaac J. Tumbelaka, worked as an attorney, while his mother, Margaretha Siwydan, was an obstetrician. Upon completing his primary studies at the Hollandsch-Inlandsche School in Kotamobagu in 1933, Tumbelaka moved to Tomohon and completed his secondary education at the Meer Uitgebreid Lager Onderwijs in 1936. Tumbelaka was unable to continue his studies for two years due to a lack of funding from his parents. He was able to continue to study after one of his uncles sent him to study in Surabaya. On his final year in Surabaya, the Japanese invaded Surabaya, and the school he was studying on was closed. With the help of politician Sam Ratulangi, Tumbelaka was sent to Japan to study medicine.

Tumbelaka returned to Indonesia after the surrender of Japan in 1945 and initially refused Ratulangi's suggestion to further study medicine in the University of Amsterdam. He relented after being convinced by Ratulangi and graduated from the university in 1955.

== Career ==
After graduating from the University of Amsterdam, Tumbelaka returned to Indonesia and began his career as a physician at the Jebres Public Hospital in Surakarta. Two years later, Tumbelaka moved to Jakarta and became a pediatrician at the Dr. Cipto Mangunkusumo Hospital. He concurrently continued his medical studies at UI's faculty of medicine. He also studied pediatric gastroenterology at the University of Western Ontario from 1961 until 1962 and at the University of Colombo in 1975. As a pediatrician, Tumbelaka held leading positions in pediatric organizations such as the Indonesian Pediatrician Association and the ASEAN Pedriatic Federation. He actively promoted the usage of breast milk for infants and invented honey sugar milk (susu gula madu, SGM), which became a popular variant of milk in Indonesia.

In 1970, Tumbelaka was appointed as the third deputy dean—responsible for student affairs—of the medicine faculty by Mahar Mardjono, the faculty's dean. Mahar Mardjono became the rector of UI in 1974 and Djamaloeddin was appointed in his place. Djamaloeddin promoted Tumbelaka from the post of third deputy dean to first deputy dean—responsible for academic affairs. Due to his health condition, Djamaloeddin resigned as dean in August 1976 and Tumbelaka became the acting dean of the faculty until December that year. He was replaced as first deputy dean in 1977 and became a professor in pediatrics in 1981.

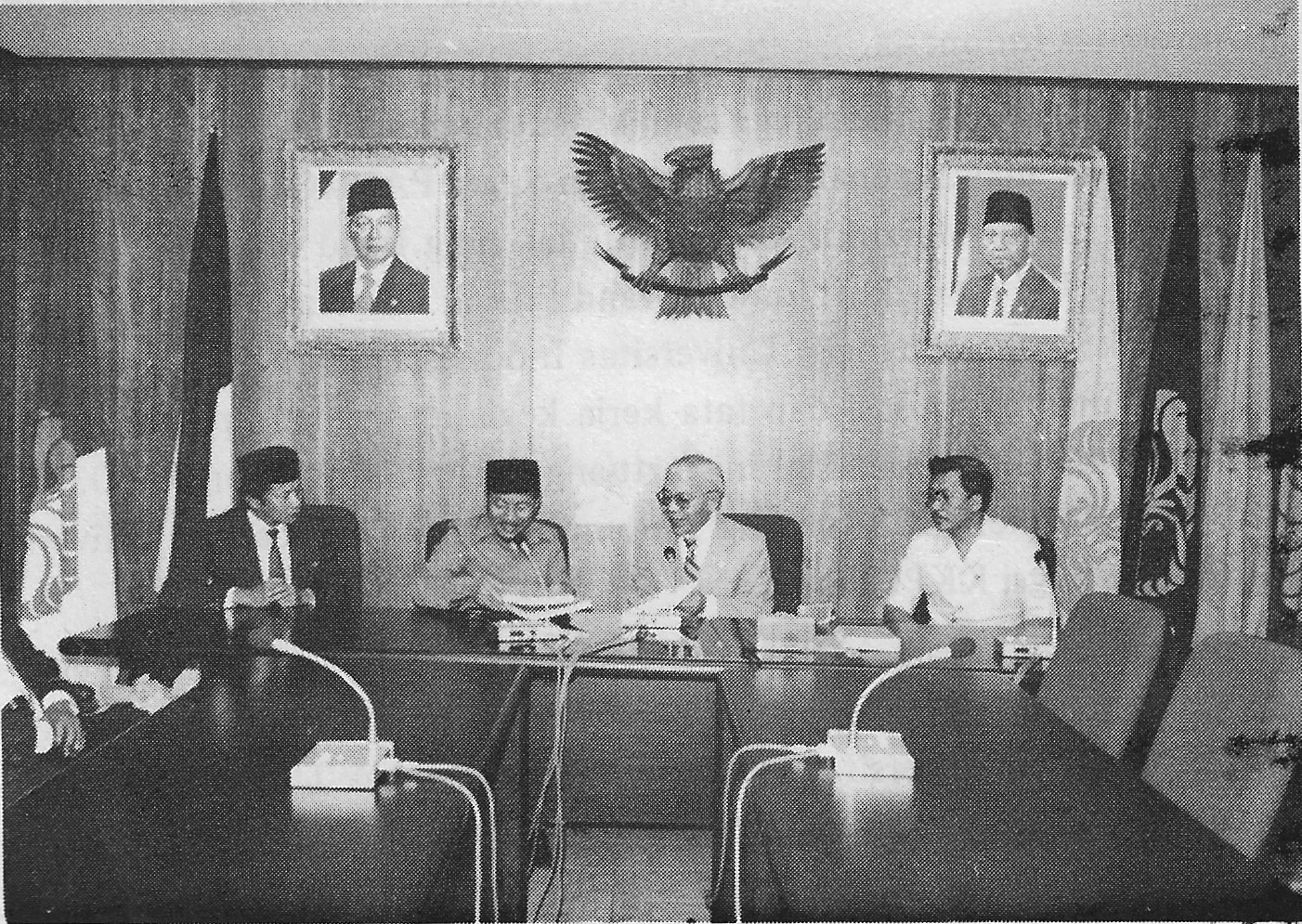
Tumbelaka (second from right) receiving Abdul Aziz Umar, Brunei's minister of education and health, during his visit in Indonesia.

On 15 January 1982, Mahar Mardjono was replaced by historian Nugroho Notosusanto. Nugroho then appointed Tumbelaka as the first deputy rector of the university. A year later, Nugroho was appointed as the Minister of Education and Culture in Suharto's Fourth Development Cabinet. Nugroho was not relieved from the position of rector, but the day-to-day activities of the university were run by Tumbelaka. Nugroho died suddenly on 3 June 1985 and Tumbelaka became acting rector of the university. Tumbelaka handed over his position to Sujudi, the new elected rector, on 15 January 1986. He retired from UI shortly after.

== Later life and death ==
Upon his retirement from UI, Tumbelaka moved to the Tarumanagara University, a private university, and became the dean of university's medicine faculty. He also became the chairman of the Medical Ethics Honorary Council of the Indonesian Medical Association.

Tumbelaka died on 11 September 2012 in Jakarta. His body was laid at the main lobby of UI's faculty of medicine before his interment at the Menteng Pulo Public Cemetery.

== Personal life ==
Tumbelaka was married to Concordia Sophia Lodola Mononutu, the niece of former minister Arnold Mononutu. The couple has three children. On one occasion, Tumbelaka had to expel two of his children, who were studying at UI's medical faculty, for failing to pass an evaluation.
