= Mardiono Marsetio =

Indonesian ophthalmologist and academic

Dean of the University of Indonesia Faculty of Medicine
- In office 11 September 1990 – 4 September 1996
- Preceded by: Asri Rasad
- Succeeded by: Ali Sulaiman

Personal details
- Born: 12 October 1937 Jambi, Dutch East Indies
- Died: 19 October 2008 (aged 71)
- Education: University of Indonesia (dr., Prof.)

Mardiono Marsetio (12 October 1937 – 19 May 2008) was an Indonesian ophthalmologist and a professor of at the University of Indonesia. He served as the dean of the University of Indonesia's medicine faculty from 1990 to 1996.

== Early life and education ==
Born on 12 October 1937 in Jambi as the son of a physician, Mardiono completed his high school education in Jakarta in 1956 before studying medicine at the University of Indonesia. After graduating in 1962, he broadened his expertise in ophthalmology, receiving his ophthalmology specialist certification in 1966. He received a scholarship from the French government to study ocular virology for six months in Paris. He also received a fellowship to study external eye disease in San Francisco, United States.

== Career ==
Mardiono joined the medicine faculty of the University of Indonesia as a lecturer in 1961. He was appointed as the head of the ophthalmology department at the University of Indonesia and the Dr. Cipto Mangunkusumo Hospital in 1987, serving in the position until 1990. In early July 1988, Mardiono was elected as the chairman of the Indonesian Ophthalmologist Association. He was elected for two four-years term until 1996.

On 20 July 1988, Mardiono delivered his inaugural speech as a full professor on corneal blindness and its prevention. He was appointed as the faculty's dean on 11 September 1990, serving for two three-year terms until he was replaced by Ali Sulaiman on 4 September 1996. After his tenure as dean ended, Mardiono initiated the establishment of the National Eye Health Council and became its chairman. Mardiono retained leadership after the council changed its name to the Indonesian College of Ophthalmology, serving until 2006.

Mardiono also held membership in medical ethics council, where he served as the chairman of the medical ethics council of Jakarta from 2001 to 2008 and deputy chairman of the national medical ethics council from 2007 to 2008. In January 2001, Mardiono issued a decision regarding a patient who sued a hospital after she became blind following a surgery.

Mardiono died on 19 May 2008, seven days after his birthday.

== Personal life ==
Mardiono Marsetio was married to Koos Hardjanti. The couple has two sons and a daughter.
