= Sujudi =

Indonesian physician and academic (1930–2007)

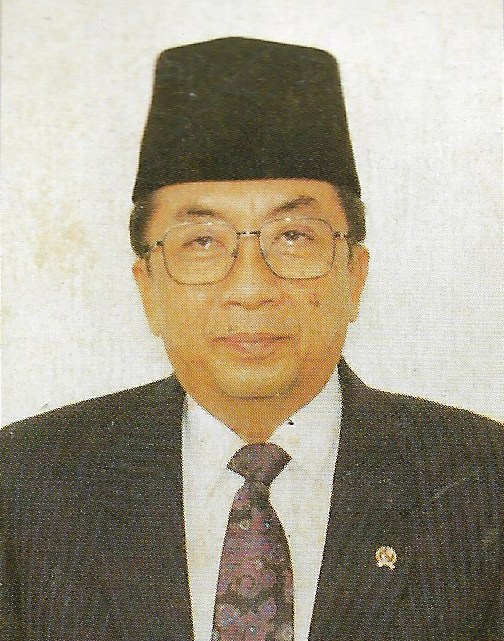
- Official portrait, 1993

Minister of Health
- In office 17 March 1993 – 16 March 1998
- President: Suharto
- Preceded by: Adhyatma
- Succeeded by: Farid Anfasa Moeloek

Rector of the University of Indonesia
- In office 15 January 1986 – 22 January 1994
- Preceded by: Nugroho Notosusanto; W. A. F. J. Tumbelaka (acting)
- Succeeded by: Muhammad Kamil Tadjudin

Deputy Rector for Academic Affairs of the University of Indonesia
- In office 1977–1982
- Preceded by: Partomo Moegihardjo Alibazah
- Succeeded by: W. A. F. J. Tumbelaka

Personal details
- Born: 8 September 1930 Buitenzorg, Buitenzorg Residency, Dutch East Indies
- Died: 23 June 2007 (aged 76) Jakarta, Indonesia
- Spouse: Faika Sujudi (m. 1963)
- Children: 3
- Education: University of Indonesia

Academic background
- Thesis: An attempt to differentiate and identify Nocardia species (1972)
- Doctoral advisor: Haris Otto Kamil Tanzil

Academic work
- Discipline: Medicine
- Sub-discipline: Microbiology

Sujudi (9 September 1930 – 23 June 2007) was an Indonesian physician and academic who became the country's Minister of Health from 1993 until 1998. Previously, he worked in the University of Indonesia as a lecturer, with his highest office being the university's rector from 1986 until 1994.

== Early life and education ==
Sujudi was born on 9 September 1930 in Bogor as the seventh of twelve children. His father, Martamihardja, worked as a field officer in the Indonesian People's Bank. Sujudi began his studies at the Taman Siswa elementary school in Bogor. After finishing his primary education there in 1944, Sujudi continued his education at Bogor's junior high school and high school. He completed his secondary education in 1950.

Upon finishing high school, Sujudi initially wanted to study chemistry at the Bandung Institute of Technology. However, due to his parents' financial condition, he decided to enter the medical faculty of the University of Indonesia (UI) in Salemba, Jakarta. He initially stayed in Bogor and had to commute to Jakarta, but later moved to Jakarta after obtaining a scholarship from the Department of Health.

Sujudi finished his propaedeutics exam in 1952 and became an assistant lecturer in microbiology in 1954. Upon receiving his undergraduate degree in February 1956, Sujudi was sent by UI to study medicine at the Stanford University for a year. He returned to Indonesia in 1957 and continued studying medicine until he obtained a medical license in 1959.

== Career ==
Sujudi began to teach in UI's medical faculty immediately after obtaining his medical license. He taught microbiology in the faculty and became the head of the faculty's microbiology section in 1966. As the head of the microbiology section, Sujudi established academic network with medical schools in Japan. He sent most of his staff, including future rector Usman Chatib Warsa and researcher Pratiwi Sudarmono, to pursue postgraduate studies in Japan.

Seven years later, on 2 December 1972, Sujudi obtained a doctorate degree from UI after defending his thesis on the identification of different species of Nocardia. He was appointed as a full professor in microbiology on 16 November 1974. Shortly after becoming a full professor, the dean of the medical faculty appointed Sujudi as the deputy dean for student and alumni affairs. Three years later, UI's rector Mahar Mardjono appointed him as the first deputy rector.

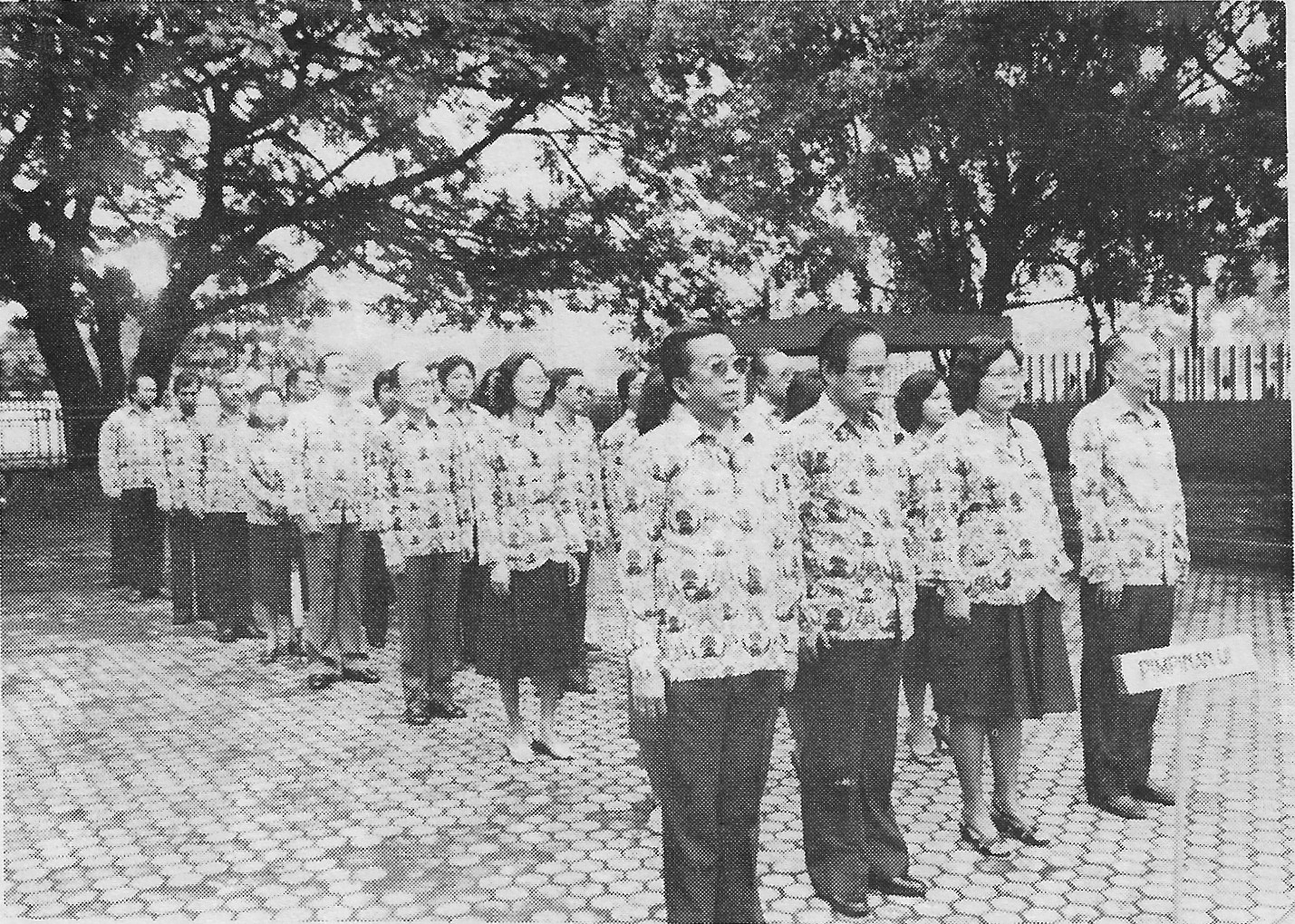
Sujudi (front) at a flag ceremony in UI, 1984

Mardjono's term as rector ended in 1982. The university's academic senate, which consisted of UI professors and dean, nominated Sujudi and Harsya Bachtiar from the literature faculty to replace Mardjono. Sujudi was mostly favored to become the new rector due to his position as well as support from the entirety of UI, including the literature faculty. Sujudi won the rector election, but the central government refused to confirm the election results. The central government then appointed military historian Nugroho Notosusanto as rector. Nugroho demoted Sujudi from the highly influential post of first deputy rector to the head of UI's research center in June 1984.

== Rector of the University of Indonesia ==
After three years of serving as rector, Nugroho died on 3 June 1985. Nugroho's first deputy, W. A. F. J. Tumbelaka, was named as acting rector and appointed Sujudi as the secretary of the academic senate. An election for a new rector was held around December 1985, with Sujudi facing Padmo Wahjono from the law faculty. As with the previous election, most of the academic senate supported Sujudi, and he was elected as the definitive rector in 1986 without facing much opposition from the government. He was re-elected as rector in January 1990. Following his appointment as health minister in March 1993, Sujudi continued holding the rector's office, with the day-to-day running of the university being handed over to his deputy Muhammad Kamil Tadjudin. Tadjudin replaced Sujudi as UI's rector on 22 January 1994.

=== Moving to Depok ===
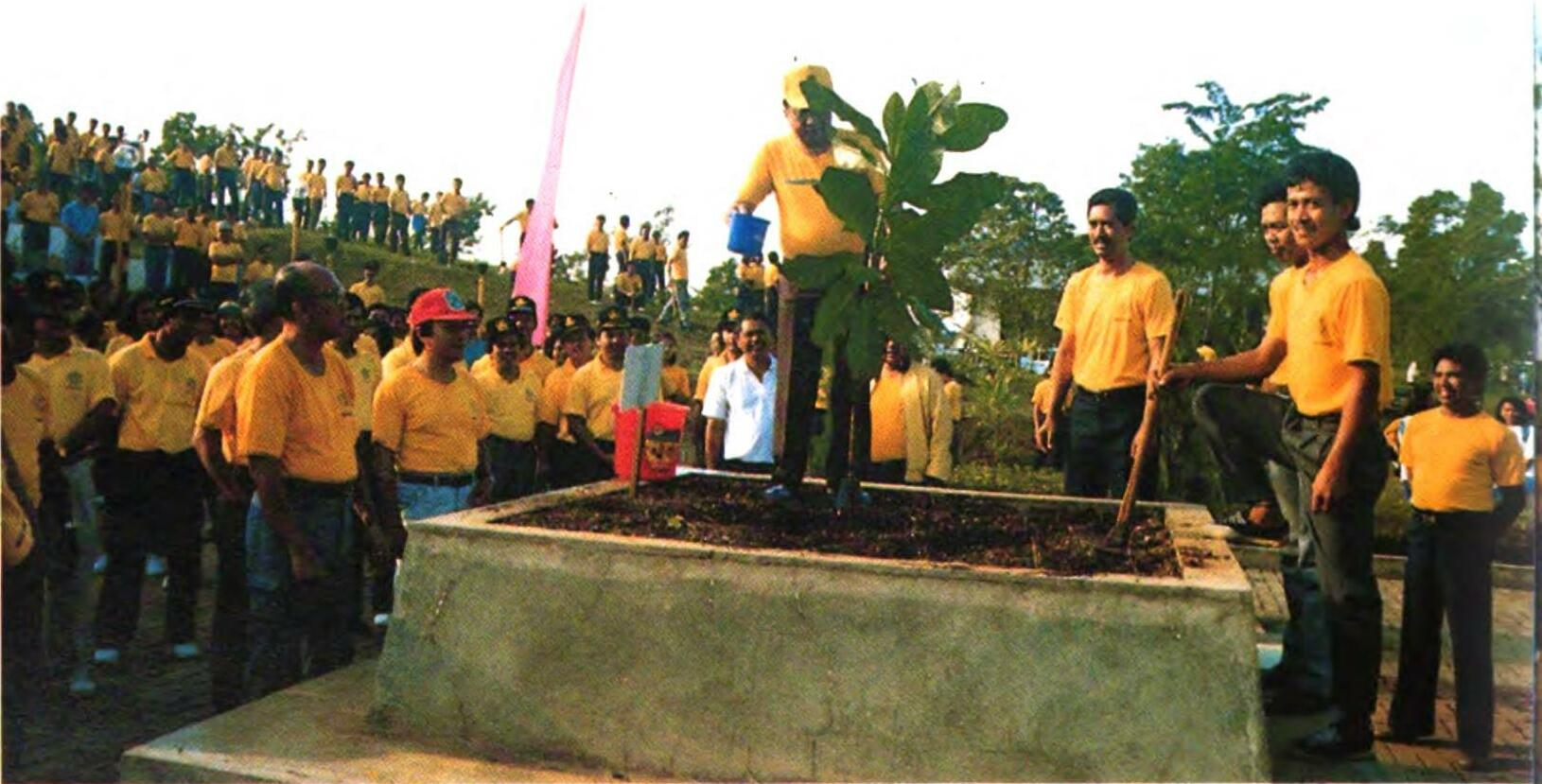
Sujudi (middle) planting a tree at the UI Depok campus

As rector, Sujudi supervised the process of moving UI's campus from Salemba to Depok in West Java. The moving process had already been planned during Mardjono's tenure and construction of the new campus was initiated by Nugroho. Sujudi described the old campus in Salemba as being too cramped, with almost no room for lecturers. Aside from continuing the construction of new buildings, Sujudi also ordered the construction of a railway station inside the new campus and proposed the merger of two subdistricts in order to simplify administrative matters in the new campus. The new campus was inaugurated on 5 September 1987. Despite this, unfinished construction and security problems still remained issues until several months later. The new campus was also criticized due to a lack of accommodation for students and lecturers as well as a lack of attention in developing the community surrounding the campus.

=== Student politics ===
Before Sujudi became rector, student organizations were mostly banned. Peter Sumariyoto, the last chairman of the UI student council before it was dissolved in 1982, was expelled by Nugroho after refusing to resign from his position. After Nugroho was replaced by Sujudi, Sujudi summoned the chairman of student senate from all faculties to a meeting. The meeting resulted in the established of an all-UI forum to coordinate student activities in the university. The plan was approved by Sujudi and the forum became a temporary replacement for the UI student council.

In July 1990, the Minister of Education issued a decree which permits the re-establishment of student councils. The decree was met with rejection by the forum, as they perceived that the decree brought the student movement under government control. Sujudi stated his contentment regarding the student rejection of the decree. Sujudi's statement was widely publicized and became viewed as his opposition to government's policy. Seeing it being interpreted as such, Sujudi later revised his statement, stating that the rejection was a "hasty attitude" and that the forum should revise their statement. The forum finally accepted the minister's decree following a prolonged meeting with the university's authority and representatives from the department of education.

=== Research university plan ===
In February 1989, Sujudi proposed his plans to transform UI into a research university. The concept for the transformation had already been developed by Sujudi during his time as the head of microbiology section and UI's research center. Despite receiving a considerable amount of support from the university's internal, Sujudi's plans was opposed by the university's alumni association, who stated that such transformation would result in the commercialization of the university.

== Health minister ==
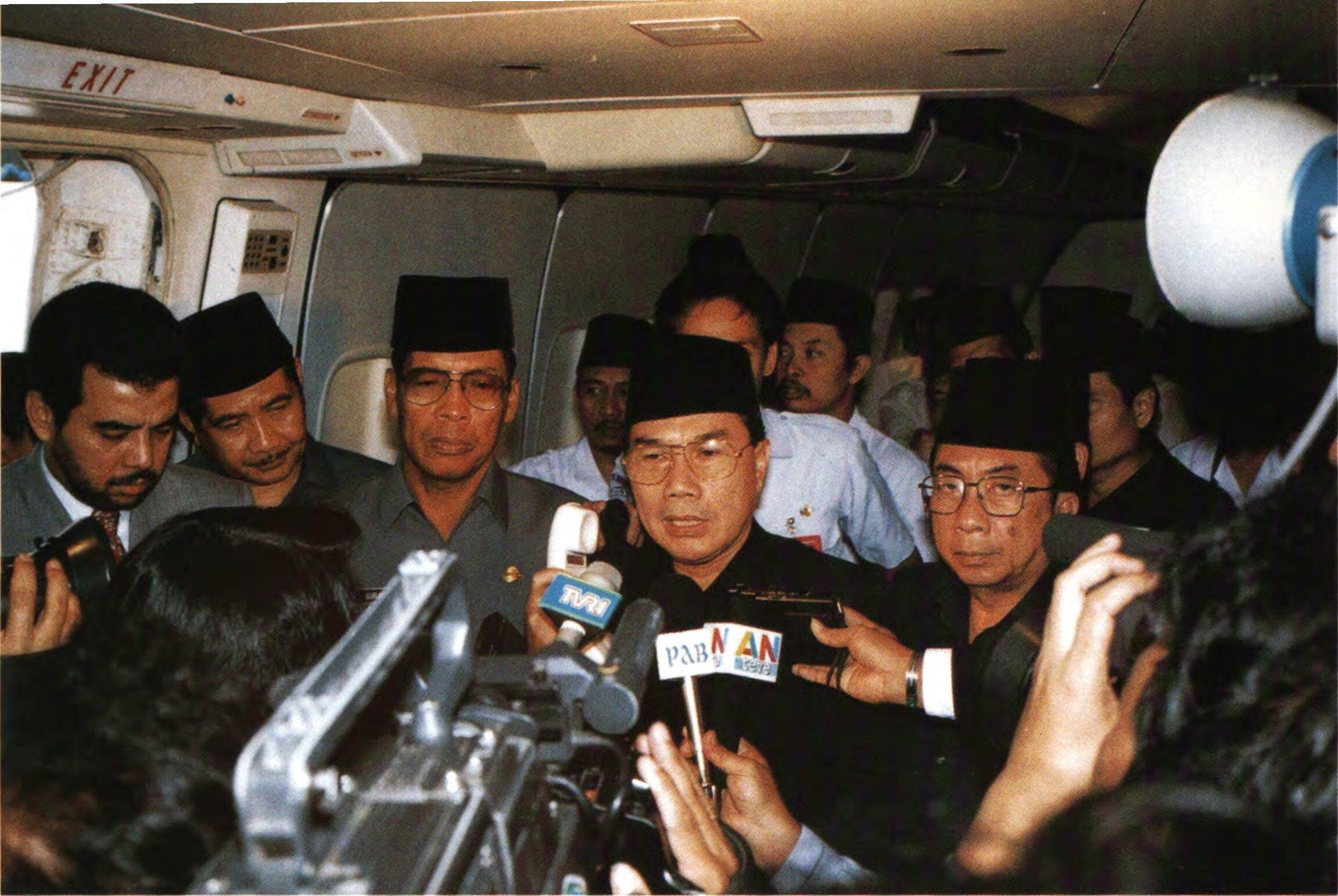
Sujudi (far right) with religious affairs minister Tarmizi Taher and Governor of Jakarta Soerjadi Soedirdja in a press conference

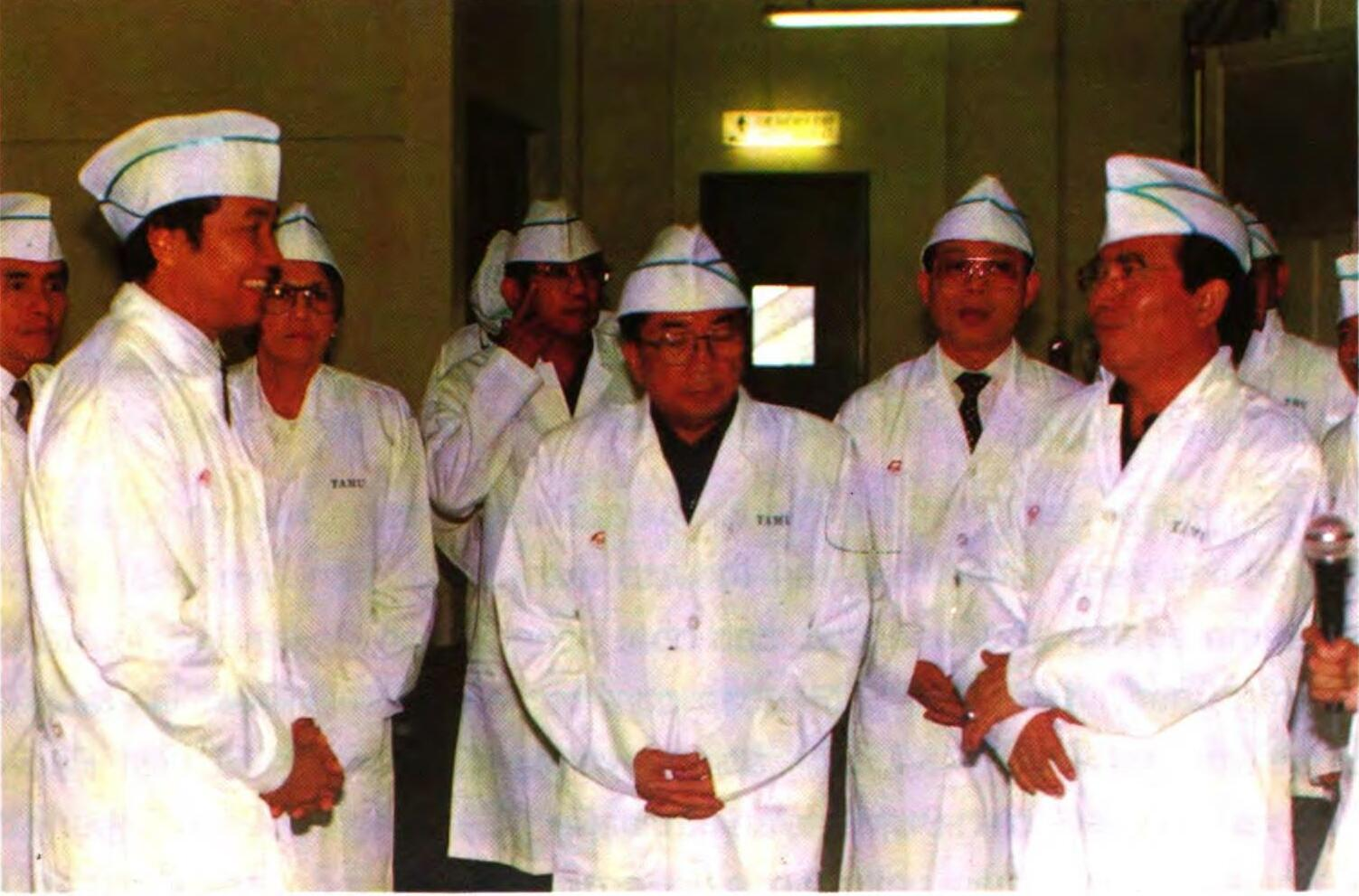
Sujudi (middle) with coordinating minister for people's welfare Azwar Anas in a pharmaceutical factory

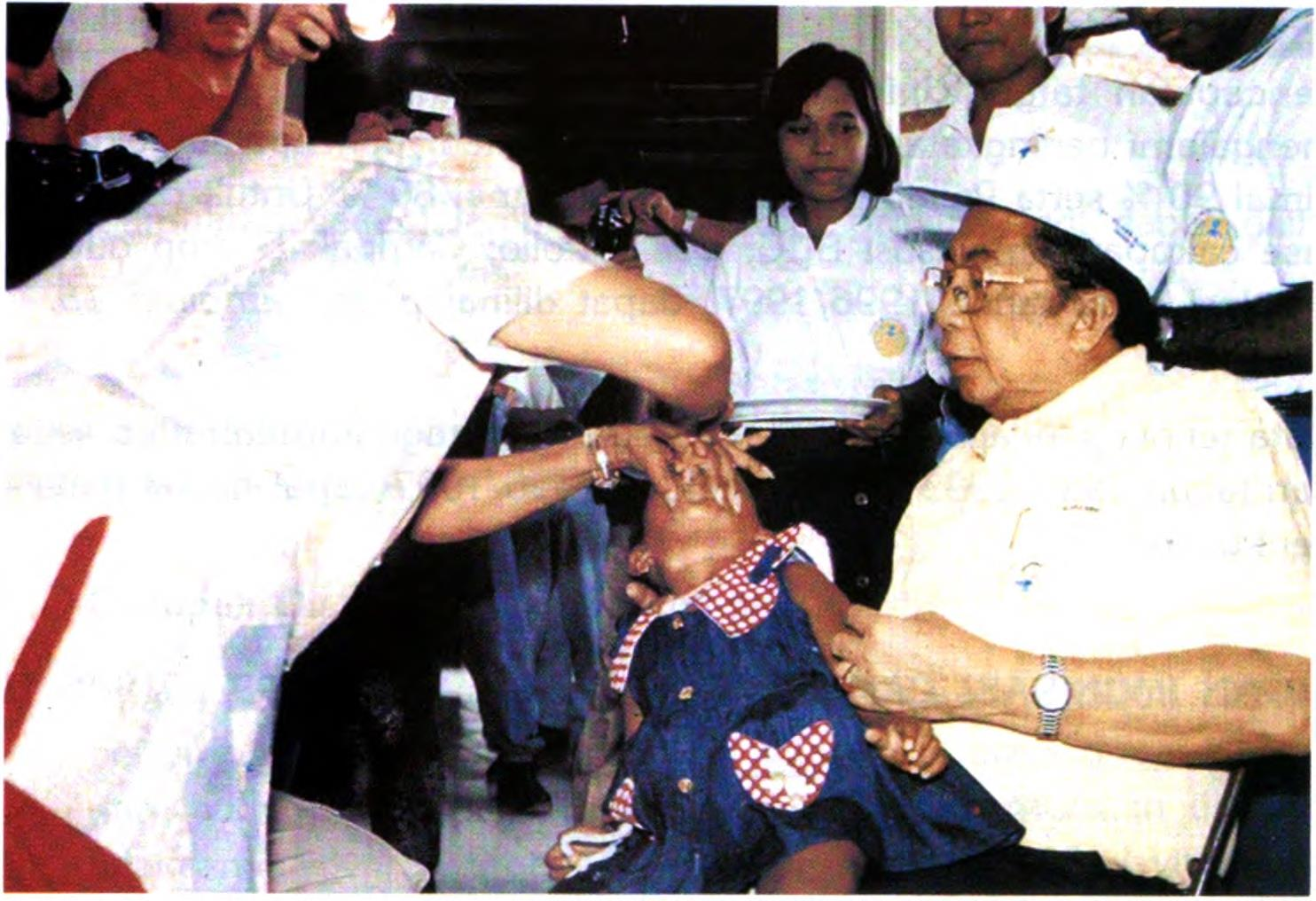
Sujudi (right) supervising the process of administering a vaccine to a baby

Towards the end of his term as rector, Sujudi became more active in various organizations. He held leading positions in academic organizations, such as the chairman of the Association of Indonesian Microbiologists and the education director of the Al-Azhar Foundation. In 1990, Sujudi became member of the Indonesian Association of Muslim Intellectuals, an organization established by minister of research and technology B. J. Habibie. His membership in ICMI led to his appointment by President Suharto as a member of the People's Consultative Assembly in early 1993 and as minister of health on 19 March 1993.

On the new year's eve of 1994, Sujudi announced that the amount of certified AIDS sufferers in Indonesia has increased to more than four-fold. The health department began preventive measures to curtail the disease by establishing an agency to combat the spread of the virus and implementing mass-scale HIV/AIDS testing for social groups deemed as "high-risk". In one incident, American basketball player Magic Johnson was blocked from entering Indonesia after Johnson reportedly contracting the HIV virus. The month after the incident, Sujudi introduced mandatory regular HIV/AIDS checks for expatriates in Indonesia in order to prevent further spread of the disease. There were suggestions to initiate a government campaign of condom usage, but Sujudi rejected the suggestion as "culturally unacceptable".

Under Sujudi, the distribution of alcohol was much more regulated. The sales of alcoholic beverages were limited to hotels and duty-free shops in an attempt to reduce sales of both legal and illegal alcohol. Sujudi was reluctant to take similar steps for tobacco, as he considered restricting sales of tobacco would have a negative effect on tax revenue and the livelihoods of women who sold cigarettes. Despite his reluctance, the department of health under Sujudi began to ban smoking in its own premises and advocated a smoking ban in all government offices.

At the end of his term, in early 1998 Indonesia experienced a financial crisis which causes prices to skyrocket, including medical supplies. Hospitals around the country had to use makeshift medical appliances. In order to handle the medical crisis, Sujudi began importing raw materials for medical supplies as well as medical supplies with a reduced exchange rate that the department would subsidize. About a month after the import began, Sujudi's term as health minister ended.

== Later life, death, and legacy ==
Sujudi remained active in organizations and companies after his retirement as health minister. He became the president commissioner of pharmaceutical company Millenium Pharmacon Internasional and medical company Kosala Agung Metropolitan, as well as a member of the board of advisors of the Indonesian Humanitarian Committee and the day-to-day chairman of the Indonesian Red Cross Society.

On 23 June 2007, Sujudi died at the Pertamina Central Hospital in Jakarta at around 10.20 a.m. Prior to his death, Sujudi was about to gave a speech in an event held at the hospital when he suddenly fell unconscious to the ground due to a heart attack. He was taken to the emergency room to receive medical treatment and died half an hour later. His body was laid at his residence in Cipayung, East Jakarta, before buried at the Kalibata Heroes' Cemetery the day after.

Following his death, a building in the Department of Health and a road inside UI was named after him. The Bogor chapter of the Indonesian Doctors Association proposed to name Bogor's central hospital after Sujudi.

== Personal life ==
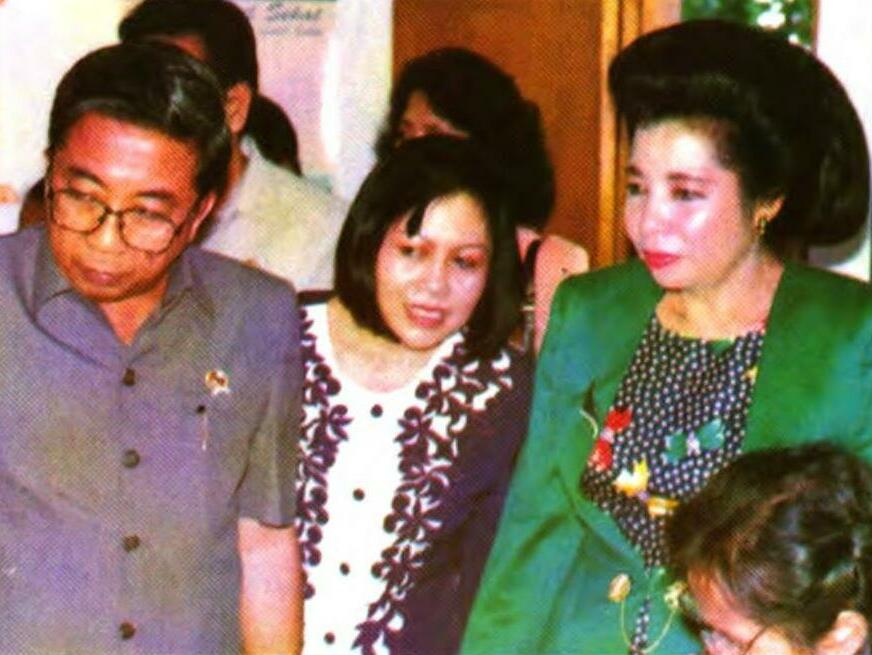
Sujudi with Faika at a work visit in Tasikmalaya, 1993

Sujudi was married to Faika Sujudi on 3 August 1963. The couple had three children.

== Honors ==
=== National ===
- Indonesia:
  - Star of Mahaputera, 2nd Class (Indonesian: Bintang Mahaputera Adipradana) (15 August 1996)

=== Foreign ===
- Austria :
  - Grand Decoration of Honour in Gold of the Decoration of Honour for Services to the Republic of Austria (1996)
- France:
  - Officer of the National Order of Merit (French: Officier de l'Ordre national du Mérite) (23 November 1989)
- Japan:
  - Order of the Sacred Treasure, 2nd Class (26 December 1988)

=== Honorary doctorate ===
- Australia
  - Doctor of Laws (Honoris Causa) from the Monash University (June 1994)
