= Sjahriar Rasad =

Indonesian radiologist (1920–1989)

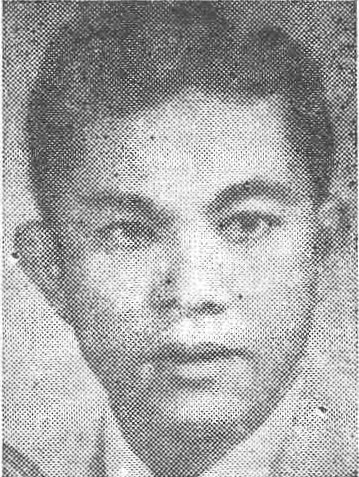
- Rasad in 1971

Dean of the University of Indonesia Faculty of Medicine
- In office 1964–1970
- Preceded by: Margono Soekarjo
- Succeeded by: Mahar Mardjono

Personal details
- Born: 7 December 1920 Padang, West Sumatra, Dutch East Indies
- Died: 9 May 1989 (aged 68) Jakarta, Indonesia
- Spouse: Upik Rasad
- Children: 1
- Parent: Zainuddin Rasad (father)
- Education: University of Indonesia (dr., Prof.); Columbia University

Academic work
- Discipline: Medicine
- Sub-discipline: Radiology
- Doctoral students: Farid Anfasa Moeloek

Baginda Sjahriar Rasad (7 December 1920 – 9 May 1989) was an Indonesian physician and a professor of radiology at the University of Indonesia. He was the dean of the university's faculty of medicine from 1964 to 1970 and a fellow of the American College of Radiology and the Australasian College of Radiologists.

== Early life and education ==
Sjahriar was born on 7 December 1920 in Padang as the son of Zainuddin Rasad, an engineer who would later become Indonesia's agriculture minister during the Indonesian National Revolution.

After completing his primary education at the Europeesche Lagere School, he studied at the Koning Willem III School te Batavia and completed his final exam in 1939. He then studied at the Geneeskundige Hoogeschool te Batavia (Batavian Medical School). After the course of the Japanese occupation of the Dutch East Indies, the school's name was changed to Djakarta Ika Daigaku (ジャカルタ医科大学). Sjahriar was active in the Ika Daigaku's student senate and protested against Japanese rule. Following the proclamation of Indonesian independence, Sjahriar spread pamphlets on the proclamation. He graduated in 1945 after interning at the Jakarta Central Hospital for two years.

== Academic and medical career ==
Upon completing his medical education, Sjahriar was assigned to the health department, where he became a physician in Aceh, West Sumatra, Cikarang, and the Jakarta Central Hospital. He then became an assistant researcher at the Eijkman Research Institute from 1946 to 1948. During this period, Sjahriar was involved in developing x-ray technology in Indonesia in the midst of the Indonesian National Revolution.

Sjahriar underwent further training in radiology at various health agencies in Europe after receiving a recommendation letter from the then-fledgling Indonesian government. From 1948 to 1949, Sjahriar resided in United Kingdom, where he studied radiology at the University of London Royal Cancer Hospital and the Holt Radium Institute in Manchester. From 1949 to 1950, he received training from the Radiumhemmet in Sweden and Fondation Curie in France. Around the same period, he also studied radiology at the Columbia University College of Physicians and Surgeons and received a diploma from the American Board of Radiology in December 1950. Aside from his studies, Sjahriar was involved in organizing student rallies to pressure foreign governments to support Indonesia.

Sjahriar returned to his alma mater in 1950 as a researcher, and later radiology instructor. He also opened a private radiology clinic at the Cut Meutia street in Jakarta. On 1 February 1957, Sjahriar was appointed as a full professor in radiology, making him the university's youngest full professor at the age of 36 years and two months. On the same year, he was appointed as the head of the radiology department in the faculty and the Jakarta Central Hospital. He also served as the faculty's deputy dean and secretary from 1960 to 1964.

In 1961, Sjahriar was accused of being involved in NIGO (Nederlandse Indische Guerilla Organisatie, Dutch Indies Guerrilla Organization), an alleged conspiracy to assassinate President Sukarno and stage a coup. Despite a lack of political activity and the absence of evidence against him, Sjahriar continued to be put under house arrest.

In 1964 Sjahriar was elected as the faculty's dean, replacing surgeon Margono Soekarjo. On the same year, UI's rector Syarif Thayeb was appointed by President Sukarno as Minister of Higher Education and Sciences. Sjahriar and Slamet Iman Santoso from the medicine faculty, and Widjojo Nitisastro from the economics faculty were elected by the university's senate as nominees for Syarif's replacement. However, Sjahriar's name was not presented to President Sukarno. Sukarno eventually rejected all three names and appointed Soemantri Brodjonegoro from outside the university as the new rector instead.

During his tenure, he emphasized the importance of research in universities, stating that "a university without research activity could not be considered as a reputable scientific institution". He also proposed a minimum standard for private medical colleges to prevent them from "descending into anarchy". He served as dean until 1970.

== Organizational career ==
Outside his academic career, Sjahriar was active in a number of regional and professional organizations and agencies. He was the chairman of the national center and a member of the coordinating board of the Southeast Asian Ministers of Education Organization, where he represented Indonesia in a number of regional meetings. He was the inaugural chairman of the Indonesian Medical Consortium, serving from its establishment in 1969 until 1970. He was also the president of the Indonesian Radiology Society and chaired a joint commission between the Department of Health and the National Atomic Energy Institute.

Outside Indonesia, Sjahriar held memberships in the International Society of Radiology, Pan Pacific Surgical Association, Asian-Oceania Society of Radiology, and the American College of Radiology. Sjahriar had been a member of the latter since 1950 and received an honorary fellowship from the college on 9 February 1968. He also received an honorary fellowship from the Australasian College of Radiologists and the German Radiological Society.

== Later life ==
After completing his term as dean in 1970, Sjahriar continued his activities in medicine organizations. He became the Indonesian representative at the Governing Body Asean Scholarship Program in 1980 and was recognized as a radiology expert by World Health Organization in 1981. He continued to advise students in the faculty, including future health minister Farid Anfasa Moeloek. He retired and resigned from all positions in 1985. He died at his residence in Maluku Street, Jakarta, on the morning of 9 May 1989, and was interred at the Karet Public Cemetery on the same day. Several prominent figures, such as information minister Boediardjo, Jakarta governor Wiyogo Atmodarminto, and social ministry secretary general Tulus Supranoto delivered their condolences.

== Personal life ==
Sjahriar was married to Upik Rasad, a professional bridge player. The couple has a child from their marriage.
