= Muhammad Kamil Tadjudin =

Indonesian medical biologist (1937–2017)

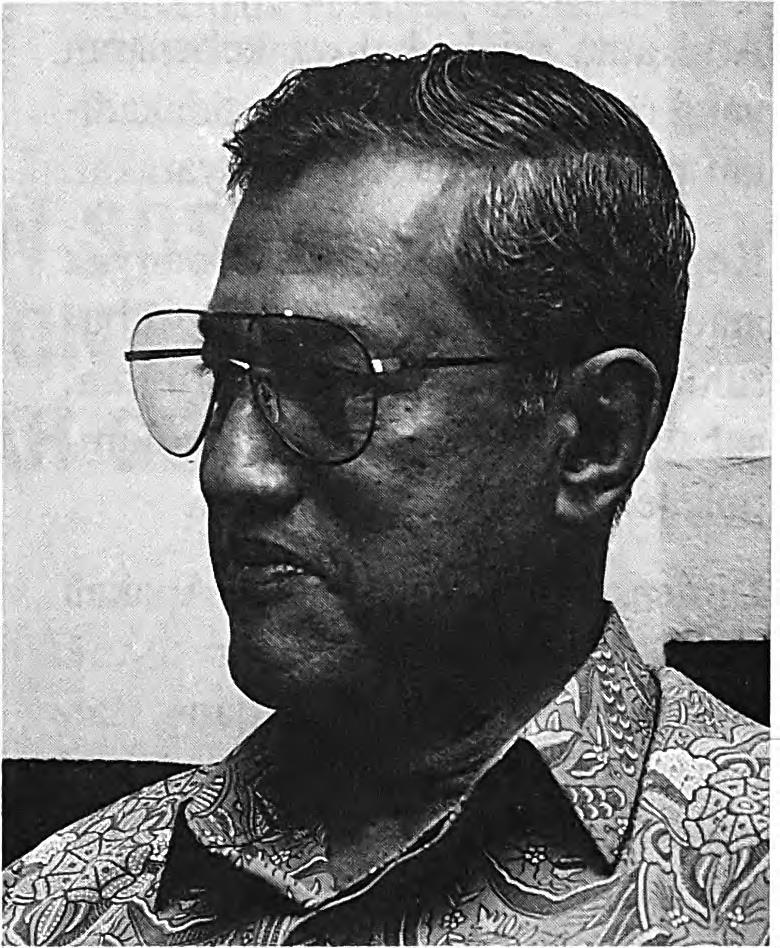
- Tadjudin in 1994

Rector of the University of Indonesia
- In office 22 January 1994 – 16 February 1998
- Preceded by: Sujudi
- Succeeded by: Asman Boedisantoso Ranakusuma

Deputy Rector for Academic Affairs of the University of Indonesia
- In office 3 June 1988 – 13 April 1994
- Preceded by: Rustam Didong
- Succeeded by: Asman Boedisantoso Ranakusuma

Personal details
- Born: 3 November 1937 Batavia, Dutch East Indies
- Died: 5 May 2017 (aged 79) Jakarta, Indonesia
- Education: University of Indonesia (dr., Dr., Prof.); University of McGill (SpAnd)

Muhammad Kamil Tadjudin (3 November 1937 – 5 May 2017) was an Indonesian physician and professor in medical biology. He served as the Rector of the University of Indonesia (UI) from 1994 until 1998.

== Early life and education ==
Tadjudin was born on 3 January 1937 in Batavia, Dutch East Indies to a Betawi family. Upon finishing his high school education, Tadjudin studied medicine at the University of Indonesia (UI). During his studies in the university, Tadjudin became the assistant lecturer in biological studies in 1958. He graduated from the university as a doctor in 1962. Upon graduating from the university, Tadjudin pursued further studies on medical biology in 1963 and in the field of human genetics and medicine at the McGill University from 1963 until 1964.

== Career ==
Tadjudin returned to Indonesia shortly afterwards and began his career as a lecturer in the medicine faculty of UI. In the faculty, Tadjudin taught basic genetics, reproductive biology, cell genetics, as well as cell and molecular genetics. After working as a lecturer for several years, Tadjudin became the head of the faculty's biology section in 1969. Several years later, UI rector Mahar Mardjono appointed him as the rector's special assistant in research and library. Tadjudin was appointed as a full professor in medical biology. In 1984, Tajduddin became the chair of the basic natural sciences department in the medicine faculty. Tadjudin was later appointed to head UI's research center in 1986, replacing Sujudi who was elected as UI's rector.

Tadjudin's career in UI began to rise following his appointment as first deputy rector on 3 June 1988. On 19 March 1993, Sujudi was appointed as the health minister, and the day-to-day running of the university was handed over to Tadjudin as first deputy rector. Shortly afterwards, Tadjudin was elected by UI's academic senate as the university's rector and was installed as rector on 22 January 1994.

During his tenure, the university implemented the non-thesis degree policy, which allowed students to graduate without publishing a thesis. The policy was enacted through a rector's decree on 26 February 1996, but was only announced a week later on 4 March 1996. The policy was met with controversy by the university's students, with some comparing it to a clearance sale. Tadjudin's first deputy, Asman Boedisantoso Ranakusuma, stated that the policy increased the number of UI graduates from an annual average of around 1000 graduates to 5000 graduates.

Tadjudin became the rector of UI until 16 February 1998 and was replaced by Asman. Several months after the end of his term, in May 1998 Tadjudin along with Asman and several other academicians visited President Suharto at his residence to discuss about his resignation and succession.

== Later life ==
Tadjudin continued his career in education as the Chairman of the National Accreditation Body for Higher Education (Badan Akreditasi Nasional Perguruan Tinggi, BAN-PT). He was appointed on 5 January 1999 and served for two terms until August 2007.

In 2004, Tadjudin was asked by the Rector of the Syarif Hidayatullah State Muslim University, Azyumardi Azra, to assist him in establishing a medical faculty in the university. Tadjudin managed to establish the faculty and became its dean until 2015. Tadjudin continued to taught medicine in the Syarif Hidayatullah State Muslim University until his death. Tadjudin died on 5 May 2017 at the Metropolitan Medical Center Hospital in Jakarta and was buried at the Karet Bivak Public Cemetery.

== Personal life ==
Tadjudin was married to Oemi Alifah. The couple had two children.
