= Qouluf, the Ensorcelled =

2024 Indian Kashmiri language film

Qouluf, the Ensorcelled is a 2024 Indian Kashmiri-language drama film directed by Ali Emran and produced by Mrs. Yaqout Mushtaq under the banner Hot Ice. Released on 4 October 2024, the film was distributed by Seven 2 Creations. It was the first color Kashmiri-language feature to premiere at a cinema hall in Kashmir in over six decades.

== Plot ==
“Qouluf” follows Razzak Reshi, a humble caretaker of an abandoned church in Kashmir. After a mysterious encounter with a child, he embarks on a spiritual journey guided by the mystical Rishi-Sufi traditions of Sheikh Nur al-Din Wali and Lal Ded. Confronting personal grief, moral dilemmas, and material temptations, Razzak seeks enlightenment and inner peace, embodying the essence of Kashmiriyat.

== Cast ==
- Bashir Dada as Razzak Reshi
- Nazir Josh
- M. Ameen
- Arof Zeeshan
- Hakeen Javaid
- Hassan Javaid
- Rasheed Shahnaaz
- Shahida Alvi
- Ali Emran

== Production ==
Produced by Hot Ice, the film was shot entirely in Kashmir, with a focus on authentic spiritual and cultural motifs. The cinematography and ambient soundtrack reflect a convergence of folk tradition and meditative themes, rooted deeply in regional identity.

== Themes ==
The film unfolds as a spiritual odyssey, emphasizing themes of loss, redemption, and enlightenment. It integrates Rishi-Sufi philosophy and celebrates Kashmiriyat—the region's distinctive ethos of harmony and syncretism.

== Release and reception ==
Qouluf, the Ensorcelled premiered on 4 October 2024 at INOX Cinema, Srinagar. The film was also covered in regional press for its unique philosophical approach and contribution to Kashmiri-language cinema. It was showcased at the Jehlum Jammu and Kashmir Film Carnival, organized by Seven 2 Creations. Critics praised its visual storytelling and cultural resonance, with reviews noting its “cinematic meditation on Kashmiriyat and spiritual awakening”.
