= Siti Noordjannah Djohantini =

Indonesian Islamic scholar (born 1958)

Leader of Aisyiyah
- Incumbent
- Assumed office 6 August 2015
- Preceded by: Siti Chamamah Soeratno

Personal details
- Born: 15 August 1958 (age 68) Yogyakarta, Special Region of Yogyakarta, Indonesia
- Citizenship: Indonesian
- Spouse: Haedar Nashir
- Education: Muhammadiyah University of Yogyakarta (BA), Islamic University of Indonesia (MA)

Siti Noordjannah Djohantini (born 15 August 1958) is a female Islamic scholar from Indonesia currently serving her second term as the leader of Aisyiyah, Indonesia's first all-female Muslim organization. She was elected to her second term as leader on 6 August 2015, the same day on which her husband Haedar Nashir was elected to his first term as leader of Muhammadiyah. She was also the co-founder of Yasanti, Indonesia's first female workers' rights NGO.

Djohantini was raised in a household that was very active in Islamic civil society groups. She attended Muhammadiyah schools from elementary to high school, was the vice president of Muhammadiyah's student wing from 1983 to 1986, was the chairwoman of Aisyiyah's youth wing from 1990 to 1995, and worked as a lecturer at Muhammadiyah University of Yogyakarta's School of Economics.

Non-profit organization positions
Preceded by Siti Chamamah Soeratno	Leader of Aisyiyah; 2015-2020	Succeeded by Incumbent
