= Siti Chamamah Soeratno =

Indonesian Islamic scholar (1941–2026)

Leader of Aisyiyah
- In office 2000–2010
- Succeeded by: Siti Noordjannah Djohantini

Personal details
- Born: 24 January 1941
- Died: 7 July 2026 (aged 85) Yogyakarta, Indonesia
- Children: 2
- Education: Gadjah Mada University (BA, PhD); School for Advanced Studies in the Social Sciences (MA)

Siti Chamamah Soeratno (24 January 1941 – 7 July 2026) was an Indonesian Islamic scholar who was the leader of Aisyiyah, Indonesia's first all-female Muslim organisation. She was also the dean of Muhammadiyah University of Malang and an expert on Indonesian literature. She served as a faculty member at Leiden University, Mercu Buana University, Sebelas Maret University and Yogyakarta State University among others.

== Life and career ==
Soeratno was born on 24 January 1941. Her involvement with Islamic organizations began early in her life. She attended a Muhammadiyah high school and became the chairwoman of Aisyiyah's youth wing in 1965. She is a proponent of the Islamization of knowledge, promoting the view that the adjective "Islamic" should refer more than to strictly religious practices and should include all aspects of life and referring to democracy, equality, justice and the human norms of liberty as "Islamic values."

Soeratno died at UGM Academic Hospital in Jakarta, on 7 July 2026, at the age of 85. She was buried at Karangkajen Public Cemetery on 8 July.
