= Haedar Nashir =

Indonesian Islamic scholar

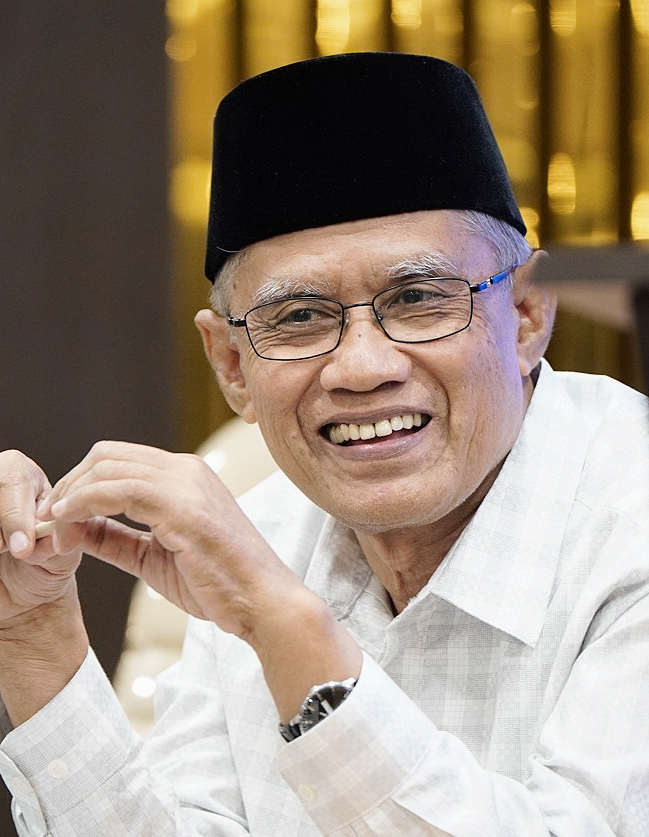
- Nashir in 2024

Leader of Muhammadiyah
- Incumbent
- Assumed office August 6, 2015
- Preceded by: Din Syamsuddin

Personal details
- Born: February 25, 1958 (age 68) Bandung, West Java, Indonesia
- Citizenship: Indonesian
- Spouse: Siti Noordjannah Djohantini
- Education: Gadjah Mada University

Haedar Nashir (born 1958) is an Indonesian Muslim scholar and the leader of Muhammadiyah since 2015. He is among the 100 top social scientists in Indonesia, and world’s 500 influential Muslims. He is also known as a professor and lecturer in the Governance Science program at Muhammadiyah University of Yogyakarta.

== Education ==
He was born in the village of Ciheulang, Ciparay, South Bandung on February 25, 1958. His father's name was H. Ajengan Bahrudin and his mother was Hj. Endah binti Tahim. He began his education at Madrasah Ibtidaiyah Ciparay, Bandung, continued to SMP Muhammadiyah III Bandung, SMA Negeri 10 Bandung, and Pondok Pesantren Cintawana, Tasikmalaya. He then pursued studies in Sociology at the School of Rural Community Development (APMD) Yogyakarta in 1990, followed by Sociology at the Graduate School of Gadjah Mada University (UGM) in 1998, and Sociology in the Doctoral Program at UGM in 2007, where he was confirmed as a Professor at Muhammadiyah University of Yogyakarta.

== Career ==
Haedar Nashir joined Muhammadiyah in 1983 (membership number 545549) and was entrusted with the position of Chairman I of the Central Committee of the Muhammadiyah Student Association from 1983 to 1986. He then became the Deputy Cadre Commissioner of the Muhammadiyah Youth Central Board from 1985 to 1990, serving as the Chairman of the Cadre Education and Development Body of the Muhammadiyah Youth from 1985 to 2000. He later served as the Editor-in-Chief of Suara Muhammadiyah Magazine from 2000 until the present. He also held the position of Secretary of the Central Board of Muhammadiyah from 2000 to 2005, and Chairman of the Central Board of Muhammadiyah from 2005 to 2015.

At the 47th Muhammadiyah Congress in Makassar on August 7, 2015, he was elected as the Chairman of the Central Board of Muhammadiyah for the period 2015-2020. Then, at the 48th Muhammadiyah Congress in Solo, he was re-elected as the Chairman of the Central Board of Muhammadiyah for the period 2022-2027.

Religious moderation is a perspective, attitude, and religious behavior embraced and practiced by the majority of Indonesia's population. The government has also designated religious moderation as one of the national programs in the National Medium-Term Development Plan (RPJMN). For Haedar Nashir, religious moderation represents a middle path in addressing issues, particularly religious ones. This middle path serves as a unifying force and avoids being swayed towards either extreme end of the spectrum. Given Indonesia's diverse population in terms of ethnicity, race, and religion, combating radical actions with radical attitudes would only give rise to other radical movements.

The religious moderation advocated by Haedar Nashir is not about equating all religions (syncretism), but rather about building bridges between religious communities. It involves understanding differences with respect and seeking common ground amidst diversity. He proposes three main pillars: first, theology and spirituality, which should be encouraged to strengthen a moderate, tolerant, and inclusive understanding of religion, returning to the essence of religion that emphasizes love, peace, and brotherhood; second, culture and ethics, which aim to cultivate a culture of dialogue, tolerance, and mutual respect among religious communities; third, politics and policies that support religious moderation and prevent extremism, thereby creating an inclusive and friendly public space for everyone.

He is also considered a moderate and objective figure in facing the wave of protests against the Christian Governor of Jakarta, Basuki Tjahaja Purnama, in November 2016, which gave rise to the "212" movement. He emphasizes the importance of Muslims advancing and being productive, while not losing opportunities to unproductive actions and avoiding involvement in religious politicization. Throughout his leadership, he has maintained a constructive and moderate relationship with various parties and figures, such as President of Indonesia Joko Widodo, the Indonesian National Police, the Indonesian National Army, political forces, and interfaith figures in Indonesia.

== Honors ==
In 2018, he received the title of "Pendekar Kehormatan Tapak Suci Putra Muhammadiyah" from the Tapak Suci Silat School in Pura Pakualam, Yogyakarta. In 2022, he was listed in the Top 100 Social Scientists in Indonesia according to the Alper-Doger (AD) Scientific Index 2022, Ranking for Scientist University, Subject, Country, Region, World. He ranked 37th on the list, making him the world's best social scientist in Indonesia for the year 2022. In 2024, Muhammadiyah also received the Zayed Award for Human Fraternity 2024, which is an international recognition of the organization or individual's efforts in demonstrating humanitarian actions and peace. He has been included in the list of the 500 Most Influential Muslims in the World from 2017 to 2024.

== Literary Works ==
- Nashir, Haedar (1997). Arogansi Kekuasaan Dalam Budaya Politik. Lentera, Jakarta. ISBN 979-95144-2-8.
- Nashir, Haedar (1997). Agama dan Krisis Kemanusiaan Modern. Pustaka Pelajar, Yogyakarta. ISBN 9799075017.
- Nashir, Haedar (1999). Pragmatisme Politik Kaum Elit. Pustaka Pelajar, Yogyakarta. ISBN 979-9075-64-5.
- Nashir, Haedar (2000). Perilaku Politik Elit Muhammadiyah. Tarawang Press, Yogyakarta. ISBN 979-8681-25-8.
- Nashir, Haedar (2000). Revitalisasi Gerakan Muhammadiyah. Bigraf-Publishing, Yogyakarta. ISBN 979-796-002-1.
- Nashir, Haedar (2006). Dinamika politik Muhammadiyah. UMM, Malang. ISBN 979-796-002-1.
- Nashir, Haedar (2001). Ideologi Gerakan Muhammadiyah. Suara Muhammadiyah, Yogyakarta.
- Nashir, Haedar (2002). Islam dan Perilaku Umat di Tengah Perubahan. Pustaka SM, Yogyakarta. ISBN 979-96991-0-X.
- Nashir, Haedar (2010). Muhammadiyah Gerakan Pembaharuan. Suara Muhammadiyah, Yogyakarta. ISBN 9789793708768.
- Nashir, Haedar (2011). Muhammadiyah Abad Kedua. Suara Muhammadiyah, Yogyakarta. ISBN 978-979-3708-73-7.
- Nashir, Haedar (2013). Islam Syariat: Reproduksi Salafiyah Ideologis Di Indonesia. PT Mizan Pustaka, Bandung. ISBN 978-979-433-746-2.
- Nashir, Haedar (2013). Ibrah Kehidupan: Sosiologi Makna Untuk Pencerahan Diri. Suara Muhammadiyah, Yogyakarta. ISBN 978-602-9417-15-9.
- Nashir, Haedar (2013). Pendidikan Karakter dalam Perspektif Agama dan Kebudayaan. Multi Presindo, Yogyakarta. ISBN 9786021740200.
- Nashir, Haedar (2014). Memahami Ideologi Muhammadiyah. Suara Muhammadiyah, Yogyakarta. ISBN 978-602-9417-13-5.
- Nashir, Haedar (2015). Gerakan Islam Pencerahan. Suara Muhammadiyah, Yogyakarta. ISBN 978-602-9417-45-6.
- Nashir, Haedar (2015). Muhammadiyah a Reform Movement. Muhammadiyah University Press. ISBN 9786023610129.
- Nashir, Haedar (2015). Understanding the Ideology of Muhammadiyah. Muhammadiyah University Press. ISBN 9786023610136.
- Nashir, Haedar (2015). Dinamisasi Gerakan Muhammadiyah: Agenda Strategis Abad Kedua. Suara Muhammadiyah, Yogyakarta. ISBN 9786029417494.
- Nashir, Haedar (2019). Indonesia dan Keindonesiaan: Perspektif Sosiologis. Suara Muhammadiyah, Yogyakarta. ISBN 9786026268747.
- Nashir, Haedar (2021). Agama, Demokrasi dan Politik Kekerasan. Suara Muhammadiyah, Yogyakarta. ISBN 978-602-7595-95-8.
- Nashir, Haedar (2022). Indonesia Ideologi dan Martabat Pemimpin Bangsa. Republika, Jakarta. ISBN 978-623-5343-01-3.

Non-profit organization positions
| Preceded by Din Syamsuddin | Leader of Muhammadiyah; 2015–present | Succeeded by Incumbent |
