= Muhammadiyah University of Makassar =

Private university in Makassar, Indonesia

- Universitas Muhammadiyah Makassar
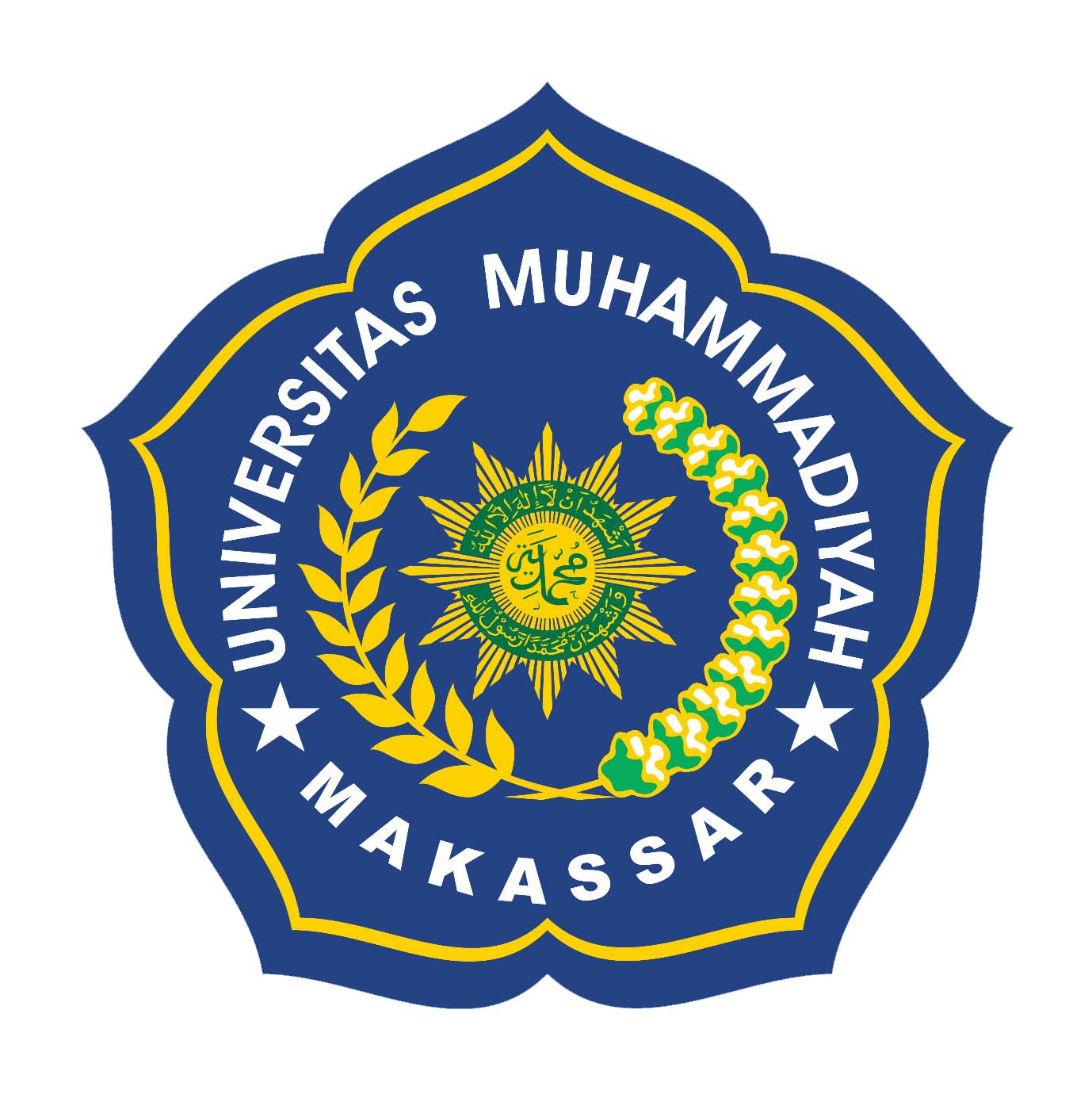
- Motto: Religious, Smart and Humanistic
- Type: Private
- Established: 1963
- Rector: Prof. Dr. H. Ambo Asse, M. Ag.
- Faculty: 7
- Administrative staff: 750
- Students: 22.220
- Location: Jln. S. Alauddin 259 Makassar 90221, Makassar, Sulawesi Selatan, Indonesia
- Campus: Rural, 3.4 acres (0.014 km^{2})
- Website: www.Unismuh.ac.id

Muhammadiyah University of Makassar (Indonesian: Universitas Muhammadiyah Makassar), also known as Unismuh Makassar, is a private university located in the city of Makassar, Indonesia. As a private university, Unismuh Makassar is coordinated under Kopertis Wilayah IX, which is a government-funded institution that coordinates private higher education in Indonesia. Unismuh is accredited 'B' based on the National Accreditation Body (BAN-PT).

== History ==
Muhammadiyah University of Makassar was founded on June 19, 1963, originally as an branch of Muhammadiyah University of Jakarta. The university's establishment was the result of the 21st meeting of Muhammadiyah Organization of South and South-East Sulawesi Chapters conducted in Bantaeng. The establishment is supported by Muhammadiyah union as an organization for education and teaching of dakwah Amar Ma'ruf Nahi Munkar, via letter number: E-6/098/1963 on 22 Jumadil Akhir 1394 H/12 July 1963 M. And then, the establishment was established by notaries R. Sinojo Wongsowidjojo according to certificate number: 71 on June 19, 1963. Muhammadiyah University Makassar was declared a private college registered on October 1, 1965.

In its early establishment, Muhammadiyah University Makassar encouraged two schools of the teacher-and Indonesian arts department, the teacher-and education for general education (GE), and social education (SE) led by the director Dr H. Sudan. In the same year (1963) Muhammadiyah university Makassar had stood alone and was led by the rector Drs. H. Abdul Watif Masri. The subsequent development of Muhammadiyah University Makassar in 1965 was the opening of a new faculty: the faculty of religious science and dakwah, economics, the faculty of social politics, the department of social welfare, and the agricultural academy. Further, in 1987 the school of engineering, in 1994 agriculture school, in 2002 opened a postgraduate program, and in 2008 opened a school of medicine. To this day, Muhammadiyah University of Makassar has had seven faculty 34 courses of study and graduate programs that have been accredited by BAN-PT.

== Campus ==
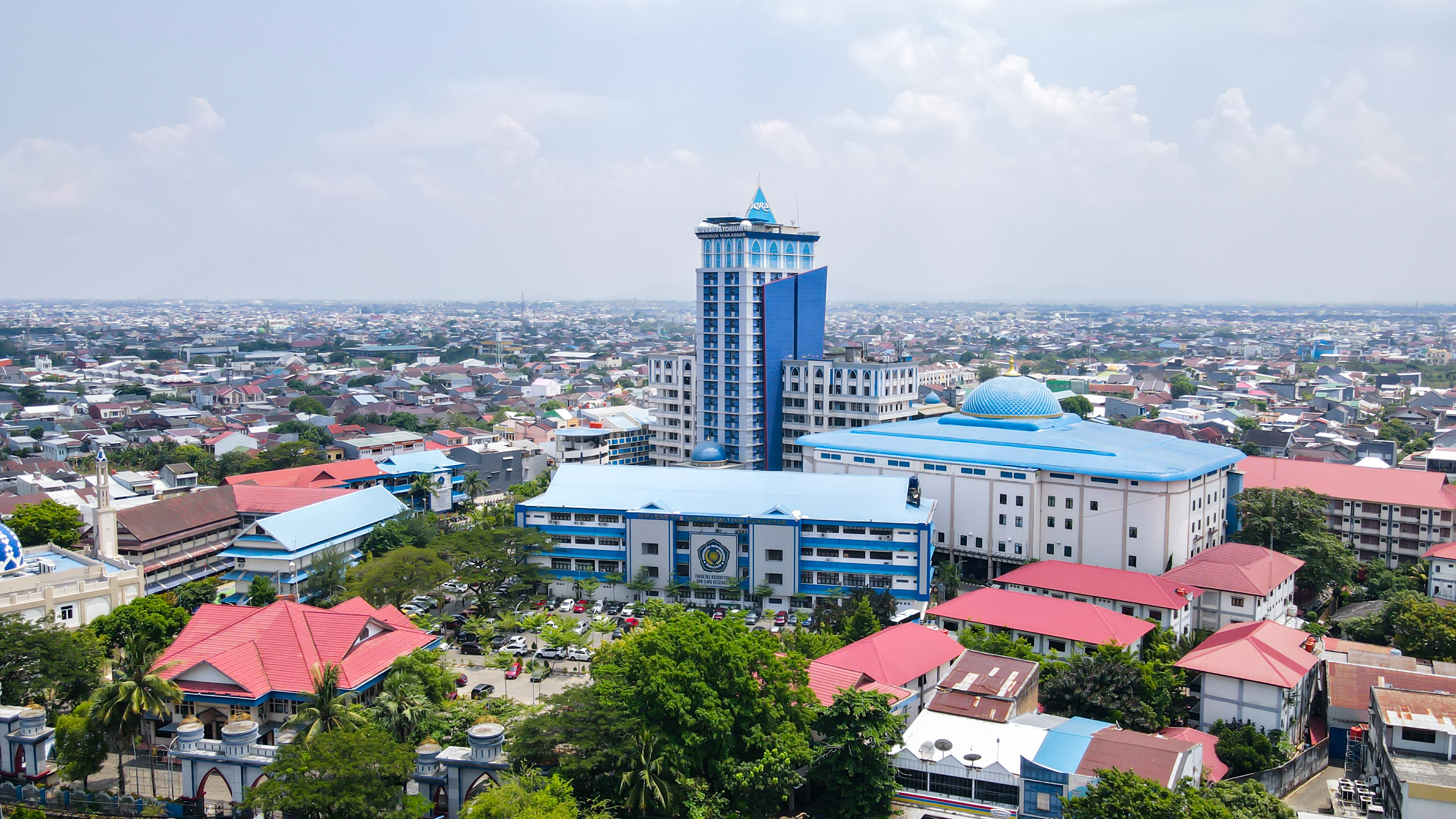
Aerial view of the main campus

Muhammadiyah University of Makassar campus is located on Jl Sultan Alauddin, Makassar. The blue color dominates all buildings on the Unismuh Makassar campus. Unismuh Makassar has three campuses at different locations. The main building is located in the south of Makassar and is built on 3.4 acres (14,000 m2) of land. In the main building, a tower is built which is known as the Iqra Tower. This tower has 17 floors. On the ground floor there is a parking lot and elevator to go to each floor of iqra tower. and currently there is a new building, namely a 3-story motorcycle parking lot. There is also a building for the faculty of teacher training and educational sciences and a building for the faculty of medicine.

One of the Unismuh campus facilities is the Mukhtamar Muhammadiyah Unismuh Makassar Convention Center. This court hall was inaugurated on Sunday, June 7, 2015. Can accommodate up to 7000 people. This building has three floors and is the main arena of Unismuh. It is known that the building measures 80x40 meters. On the second floor of the courtroom, it is also used as the Student Mall. A series of campus or commercial activities are often held at this courtroom. Other facilities of Universitas Muhammadiyah Makassar is a mosque. This mosque has a building area of approximately 2,700 square meters, three floors with a capacity of approximately 3000 worshipers. This three-story mosque costs Rp. 7 billion. Funds of this size are assistance from the Chairman of the AMCF, Dr. Syekh Al-Khoory. The name of the Subulussalam Al-Khoory Unismuh Mosque in Makassar is immortalized in part from the name of the donor. Chairman of the Asian Muslim Charity Foundation (AMCF) Dubai, Dr. (HC) Syekh Mohammad MT Al-Khoory. The university has more than 14,000 students studying different subjects.

Unismuh Makassar has several student activity units,

== Student Activity Units ==
Ikatan Mahasiswa Muhammadiyah / The Muhammadiyah Association

As for the Islamic student organizations that exist throughout the muhammadiyah university, namely Ikatan Mahasiswa Muhammadiyah (IMM) or The Muhammadiyah Student Association and one of the organizations established by the muhammadiyah union which move in the fields of Religion, Student Affairs, and Society. IMM was established in Yogyakarta on March 14, 1964. IMM has the aim of "working towards the formation of Islamic Academics with Noble Morals to achieve Muhammadiyah Goals".

The cadre levels of the Muhammadiyah Student Association are:

1. Darul Arqom Dasar (DAD)

DAD is a cadre activity for the Muhammadiyah Student Association which must be followed by all IMM cadre candidates.

2. Darul Arqom Madya (DAM)

DAM is an advanced cadre activity from DAD that teaches leadership by following the teachings of the Prophet.

3. Darul Arqom Paripurna (DAP)

DAP is cadre activity that discusses nationality.

UKM BAHASA

UKM Bahasa is a university level institution engaged in the field of languages. This institution consists of 6 divisions, namely Japanese, Arabic, Korean, Local language, English Teaching and English debate. This organization is home to university students who are interested in learning various languages.

UKM SENI DAN BUDAYA TALAS

UKM Seni dan Budaya Talas is one of the Student Organizations at Muhammadiyah University of Makassar which is engaged in the arts and culture which was established on September 29, 2000. Talas has 7 divisions, namely dance, music, design, theater, photos, film, and literature.

UKM OLAHRAGA

UKM Olahraga is one of the Student Organizations at Muhammadiyah University of Makassar which is engaged in sports. This organization was established on April 3, 2008, known as UBBT (Unit Basket Ball Team) until now it has changed to UKM-Olahraga Unismuh Makassar. As for several sports in this organization, namely, basketball, football, takraw, futsal, volleyball, table tennis, badminton, chess.

UKM PAHALA

One of the organizations in Unismuh Makassar is named PAHALA. Stands for Pemerhati Alam dan Lingkungan.

UKM SEPAK BOLA

ukm sepakbola is an organization that was established in 1999 which is engaged in sports.

LKIM PENA

LKIM-PENA was established on December 10, 2005, the Institute for Student Scientific Creativity for Research and Reasoning (LKIM-PENA) was established in the fields of writing such as Research, KTI, Essays, PKM and other written works. various achievements that have been made by superior generations in national and international writing competitions.

UKM PK CORONG

The Student Activity Unit for the Corong Campus Publishing or better known as UKM PK Corong is one of the student organizations that is active in the world of journalism or it can be said as Campus Press (journalist). UKM PK Corong which is located at the Blue Campus of the Muhammadiyah University of Makassar was established on 2 September 2000 which was initiated by Brother Muh. syafaad s. kuba, ST and Adam Nugraha, ST.

HIZBUL WATHAN

Hizbul Wathan, which is engaged in the scouting sector, which was declared at Unismuh Makassar on November 18, 1999. Hizbul Wathan is an autonomous organization from Muhammadiyah founded by KH AHMAD DAHLAN in 1918 in Yogyakarta.

TAPAK SUCI

Tapak Suci, is a school, and a pencak silat organization that is a member of the IPSI (Indonesian Pencak Silat Association). Tapak Suci is included in the 10 IPSI Historical Colleges, namely colleges that support the growth and development of IPSI as an organization. Tapak Suci is under the auspices of the Muhammadiyah Association as the 11th autonomous organization. Tapak Suci was established on 10 Rabiul Awal 1383 H, or to coincide with July 31, 1963 in Kauman, Yogyakarta.

KSR

The Indonesian Red Cross (PMI) Unit 114 Voluntary Corps (KSR) Muhammadiyah University (Unismuh) Makassar. Ksr Unit Unismuh Makassar Formed on May 24, 2002, the purpose of establishing this organization is as a forum for development for members both in first aid skills and in how to organize and socialize.

== Study programs and human resources ==
=== Study programs ===
University of Muhammadiyah Makassar offers the following study programs in various faculties:

Faculty of Teacher Training and Education (Bachelor of Education and Diploma)

Here are the following departments of Faculty of Teacher Training and Education:

- Primary School Teacher Education (Diploma / registered) (Accredited A)
- Indonesian Language and Art Education (Accredited Unggul)
- English Education (Accredited Unggul)
- Mathematic Education (Accredited Unggul)
- Curriculum and Educational Technology (Accredited A)
- Informal Schools (Accredited )
- Post Graduate of Teaching Certificate (Accredited A)
- Fine Art Education (Accredited Unggul)
- Biology Education (Accredited B)
- Physics Education (Accredited B)
- PAUD Teacher Education (Accredited Baik)
- Sociology Education (Accredited A)
- Pancasila and Citizenship Education (Accredited Baik Sekali)
- Teacher Professional Education Indonesian (Accredited A)
- Teacher Professional Education English (Accredited A)

Faculty of Agriculture (Bachelor of Agriculture)

Here are the following departments of Faculty of Agriculture:

- Agricultural Development / Communication and Agricultural Extension (registered)
- Agro-business (Accredited A)
- Marine Cultivation (Accredited B)
- Forest Management (Accredited B)

Faculty of Engineering (Bachelor of Engineering)

Here are the following departments of Faculty of Engineering:

- Civil Engineering and Planning (Accredited B)
- Electro Engineering (Accredited B)
- Irrigation Engineering (Accredited B)
- Architecture (Accredited C)
- Informatics Engineering (accredited)

Faculty of Economy (Bachelor of Economics)

Here are the following departments of Faculty of Economy:

- Economic and Development Study (Accredited B)
- Company Management (Accredited B)
- Accounting (registered B)
- Islamic Economics (Accredited B)
- Taxation-D3 (Accredited B)

Faculty of Social and Political Sciences (Bachelor and Master)

Here are the following departments of Faculty of Social and Political Sciences:

- Public Administration (Accredited A)
- Governmental Study (Accredited A)
- Communication Science (Accredited B)

Faculty of Islamics Studies (Bachelor of Islamic Studies and Diploma)

Here are the following departments of Faculty of Islamic Studies:

- Islamic Primary School Teacher Education (Diploma 2 / registered)
- Kindergarten Teacher Education (Diploma 2 / registered)
- Technique and Communication of Islamic Preaching (Diploma 3 / registered) (Accredited)
- Islamic Studies (Accredited A)
- Akhwalul Asyahsiyah (Accredited C)
- Islamic Economic and Banking (Accredited A)
- Islamic Technology Education
- Arabic Language Education (Accredited B)
- Islamic Education Guidance and Counseling (Accredited)

Faculty of Medical (doctor)

Here are the following departments of Faculty of Medical:

- Education of doctor (Accredited B)
- Doctor's Profession (Accredited B)
- Nursing (Accredited B)
- Midwifery (Accredited B)
- Pharmacy (Accredited)

Postgraduate Programs

Here are the following departments of Postgraduate Programs:

- Islamic Studies (M.Ag) (Accredited B)
- Religious and Philosophy Studies ( M.Ag)
- Management (M.M) (Accredited B)
- Management and Agro-business (M.M) (Accredited B)
- Accounting (M.Ak)
- Master of Basic Education (Accredited B)
- Master of Indonesian Language and Literature Education (Accredited B)
- Master of English Education (Accredited B)
- Master of Public Administration Science (Accredited B)
- Islamic Education S3 (Accredited )

=== Human resources ===
The academic staff of the University of Muhammadiyah Makassar consists of full-time and part-time lecturers, about 215 altogether. Fourteen of them hold a doctoral degree, 110 have a master's degree, and the rest of them hold a qualified first degree.

== Facilities ==
University Muhammadiyah of Makassar provides facilities to establish the academic activities. It starts from learning and teaching classes in several buildings, offices, laboratory, library, etc.

=== Dormitory ===
Rumah Susun Sewa bagi Mahasiswa (Rusunawa) is the dormitory building used for students. The building has two twin blocks, building A for male students and building B for female students.

=== Central Library ===
Muhammadiyah University of Makassar Library (Perpustakaan Unismuh Makassar) is in the basement of the old Rectorate building. It is known to stand in 1977. It is managed well that until now tens of millions of books are used for students references.

=== Subulussalam Al Khoory Mosque ===
Unismuh Makassar Mosque is the mosque located in the front part of the campus. The size of the three-story mosque is 2,700 square meters on a total of 4,000 square meters of land. It is designed for 2,700 people. It is stated by the rectore of Unismuh Makassar that Syekh Muhammad Al-Khoory is the one that design this building.

=== Balai Sidang Mukhtamar Muhammadiyah ===
This city hall was launched on Sunday, June 7 of 2015. It can accommodate up to 7,000 people. This three-story building is 80 x 40 meters. It is used for campus or commercial activities. The second floor is used as the Student Mall.

=== Other Facilities ===
Other facilities in Unismuh campus are:

- Students and Faculty Housing
- Administrative Headquarters
- Laboratories,
- Unismuh Medical Centre, etc.

== Networking ==
The University of Muhammadiyah Makassar has worked closely with many organizations nationally and internationally. The following are the organizations that had bilateral relationships with this university during 2005:

- Department of National Education (Education, Research and Community Services)
- Technology Application and Research Bureau (Liaison Officer)
- Science Institution of Indonesia (Oceanography Research)
- Marine Partnership Forum of South Sulawesi (Division of Research and Coastal society Empowerment)
- Technology Institution of Bandung Telecommunication (IT Development Section)
- University of Miyazaki Japan (Student Exchange Program and Japanese Language Center)
- British Council (English Language and Educational Development)
