= Muhammadiyah =

Sunni Islam organization based in Indonesia

Muhammadiyah Society
- Persyarikatan Muhammadiyah
- Insignia of Muhammadiyah

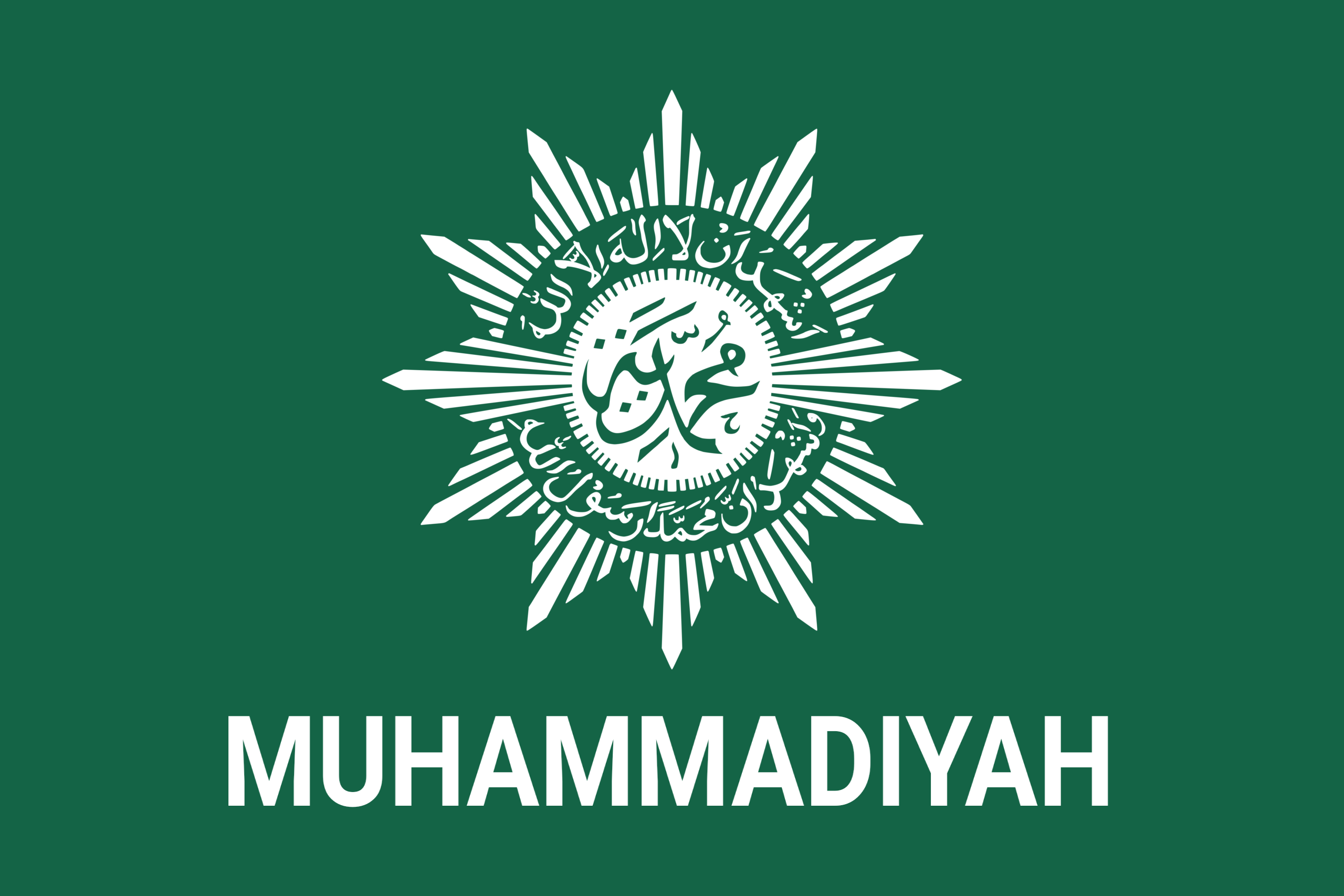
- Flag of Muhammadiyah
- Formation: 18 November 1912
- Type: Islamic organization
- Purpose: Socio-religious, economics, education, and health
- Headquarters: Yogyakarta and Jakarta, Indonesia
- Region served: Indonesia
- Members: 60 million (2019)
- Chairman: Haedar Nashir
- Secretary-general: Abdul Mu'ti
- Publication: Suara Muhammadiyah
- Affiliations: Sunni Islam (Islamic modernism)
- Website: en.muhammadiyah.or.id

Muhammadiyah (Arabic: محمدية, romanized: Muḥammadiyyah, lit. 'followers of Muhammad'), officially the Muhammadiyah Society (Indonesian: Persyarikatan Muhammadiyah), is a major Islamic mass organization in Indonesia. The organization was founded in 1912 by Ahmad Dahlan in the city of Yogyakarta as a reformist socio-religious movement. Muhammadiyah promotes ijtihad, the contextual and dynamic derivation of Islamic law directly from the Qur'an and sunnah, and rejects taqlid, blind adherence . Since its inception, Muhammadiyah has implemented a platform of renewal that integrates religious and secular education. The approach was adopted primarily as a means to foster social mobility among Muslims towards a modern, progressive society and simultaneously to purify Islamic teachings in Indonesia. It continues to support local culture and promote religious tolerance in Indonesia, while a few of its higher education institutions are attended mostly by non-Muslims, especially in East Nusa Tenggara and Papua provinces. The group also runs a large chain of charity hospitals, and operated 128 universities as of the late 1990s.

At the time of Dahlan's death in 1923, the organization reported a membership of 2,622 men and 724 women, mostly residents of Yogyakarta. Membership grew steadily—10,000 in 1928, 17,000 in 1929, and 24,000 in 1931. By the 1930s, moreover, it had begun to establish branches beyond Java, the main center of population, throughout Indonesia, and today it is said to be the second largest Islamic organization in Indonesia (behind Nahdlatul Ulama) with 60 million members in 2019. The membership is largely urban and middle class in composition. Although Muhammadiyah leaders and members are often actively involved in shaping politics in Indonesia, Muhammadiyah is not a political party. It has devoted itself to social and educational activities.

== History ==
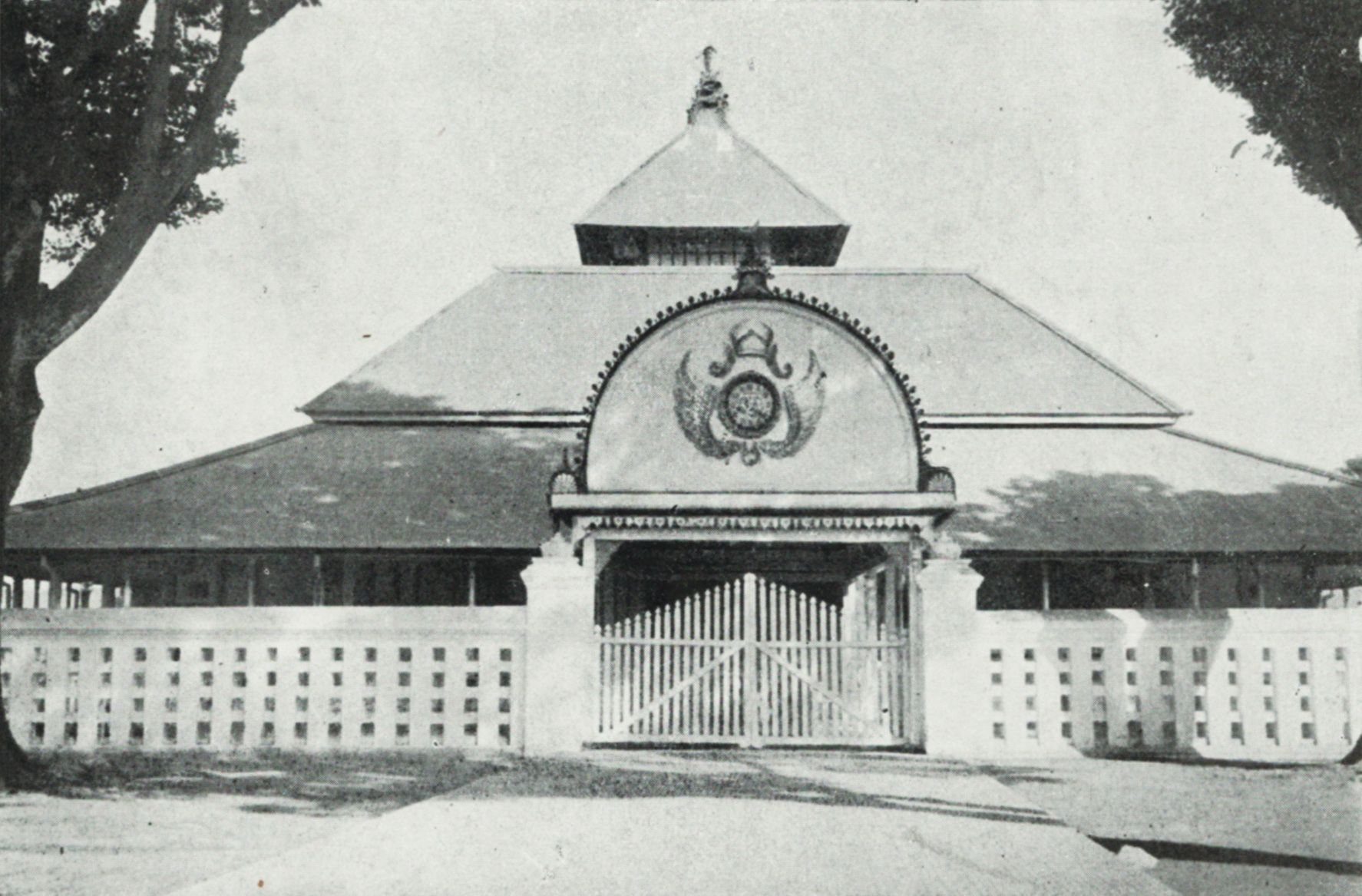
The Kauman Great Mosque became the background for the founding of the Muhammadiyah movement

On 18 November 1912, Ahmad Dahlan, a court official of the kraton of the Yogyakarta Sultanate and an educated Muslim scholar from Mecca, established Muhammadiyah in Yogyakarta. There were a number of motives behind the establishment of this movement. Among the important ones are the backwardness of Muslim society and the penetration of Christianity. Ahmad Dahlan, much influenced by Egyptian reformist Muhammad Abduh, considered modernization and purification of religion from syncretic practices were very vital in reforming this religion. Therefore, since its beginning Muhammadiyah has been very concerned with maintaining tawhid and refining monotheism in society.

From 1913 to 1918, Muhammadiyah established five Islamic schools. In 1919, an Islamic high school, Hooge School Muhammadiyah was established. In establishing schools, Muhammadiyah received significant help from the Budi Utomo, an important nationalist movement in Indonesia in the first half of the twentieth century, which provided teachers. Muhammadiyah has generally avoided politics. Unlike its traditionalist counterpart, the Nahdlatul Ulama, it never formed a political party. Since its establishment, it has devoted itself to educational and social activities.

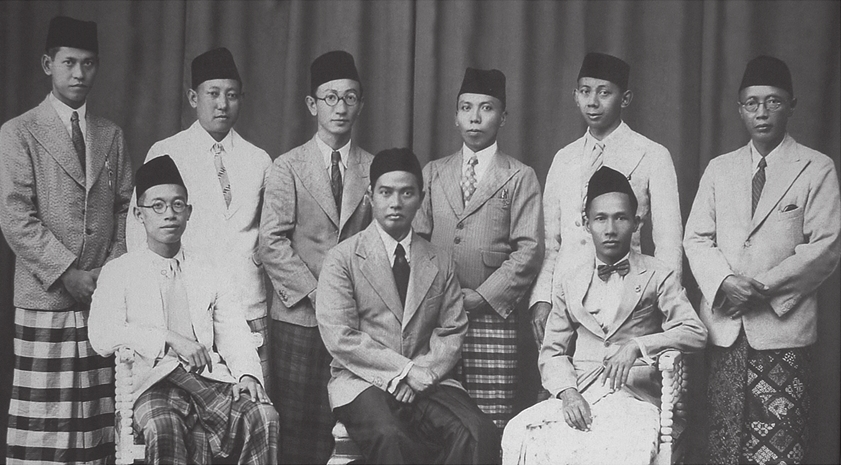
Muhammadiyah Central Committee of 1937–1943. (From left to right) Sitting: KH. Faried Ma'ruf, KH. Mas Mansur, H. Hasyim. Standing: H. Moehadie, HA. Hamid, RH. Durie, H. Abdullah, KH. Ahmad Badawi, H. Basiran Noto.

In 1925, two years after the death of Dahlan, Muhammadiyah only had 4,000 members but had built 55 schools and two clinics in Surabaya and Yogyakarta. After Abdul Karim Amrullah introduced the organization to the Minangkabau people, a dynamic Muslim community, Muhammadiyah developed rapidly. In 1938, the organization claimed 250,000 members, managed its 834 mosques, 31 libraries, 1,774 schools, and 7,630 ulama. Minangkabau businesspeople spread organization to the entire of Indonesia.

During the 1965–1966 political turbulence and violence, Muhammadiyah declared that the extermination of the Communist Party of Indonesia constituted holy war, a view endorsed by other Islamic groups, which led to the Indonesian mass killings of 1965–1966). During the events surrounding the 1998 fall of Suharto, some members of Muhammadiyah urged the leadership to form a party. Therefore, the leadership, including Muhammadiyah's chairman, Amien Rais, founded the National Mandate Party. Although gaining large support from the organization's members, the party has no official relationship with Muhammadiyah. The leader of Muhammadiyah said the members of his organization are free to align themselves with political parties of their choosing, provided such parties have shared values with Muhammadiyah.

In 2008, with 29 million members, Muhammadiyah was the second-largest Muslim organization in Indonesia, after Nahdlatul Ulama.

== Doctrine ==
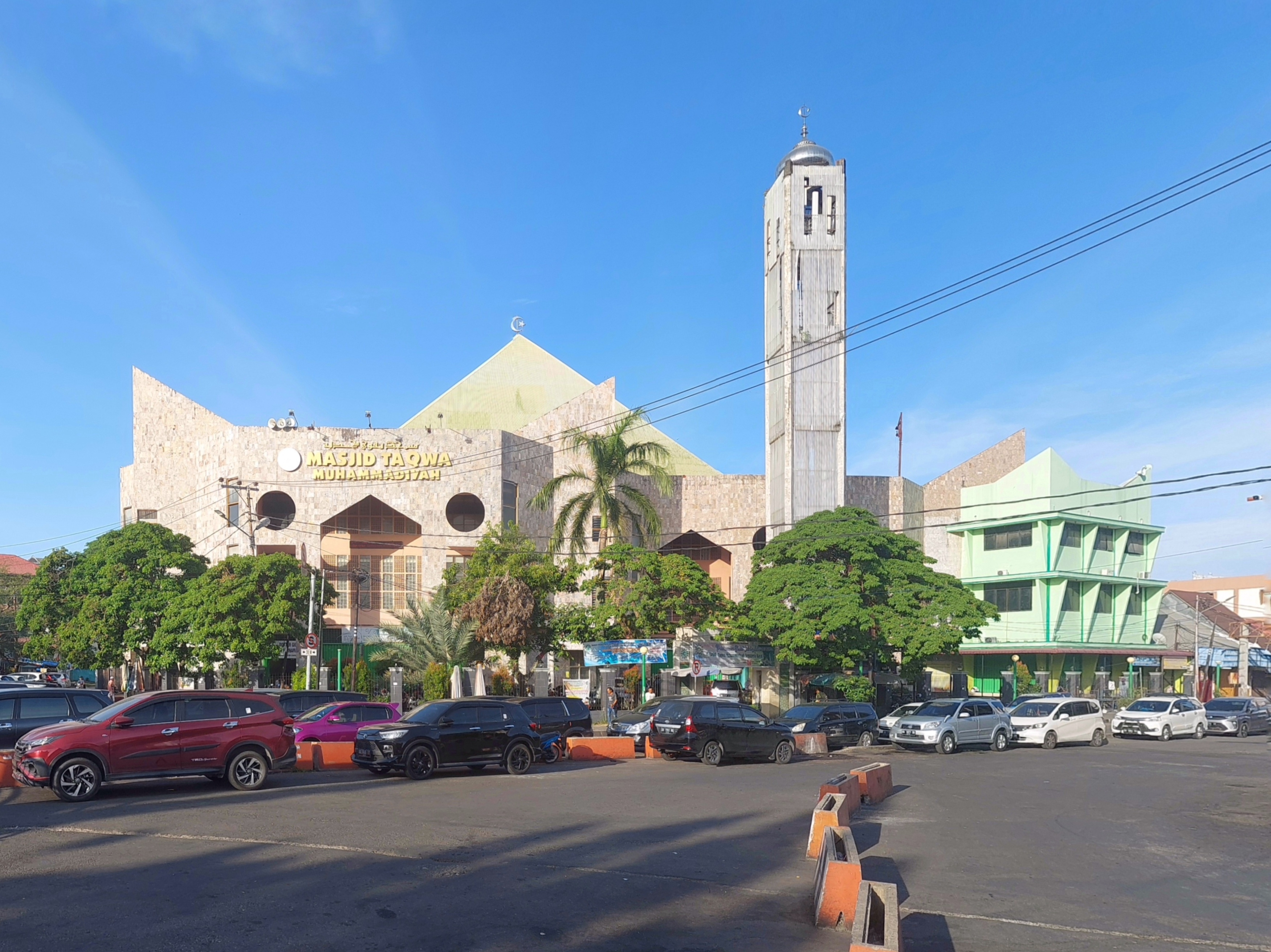
Muhammadiyah's Taqwa Mosque in Padang, West Sumatra

Muhammadiyah's central doctrine is pure tawhid, derived from and consistent with the principles of Ahlus Sunnah wal-Jama'ah. The organization emphasizes the authority of the Qur'an and Hadith as the sources of Islamic law, serving as the legitimate basis for interpreting religious beliefs and practices. The movement's primary focus is to heighten the community's sense of moral responsibility and to purify their faith, aligning it with authentic Islam. Theologically, Muhammadiyah adheres to Sunni doctrine, calling for a direct return to the Qur'an and Sunnah. It advocates for the purification of faith by evaluating and weighing various local customs against sharia and simultaneously safeguards Islamic culture and society from shirk (polytheism) and takhayul (believing in something unreal, irrational, or lacking a strong basis in religious teaching), bidʿah (unwarranted innovation), and khurafat (fabricated stories, myths, or tales of origin believed to be religious teachings despite having no basis in the Quran or the Hadith), or TBC.

Muhammadiyah strongly opposes syncretism in which Islam had coalesced with animism (spirit worship) and with Hindu and Buddhist elements, which were spread among communities from the pre-Islamic period. Muhammadiyah opposes the tradition of Sufism that allows a Sufi leader (shaykh) to be the formal authority over Muslims. As of 2006, the organization was said to have "veered sharply toward a more conservative brand of Islam" under the leadership of Din Syamsuddin the head of the Indonesian Ulema Council. Muhammadiyah refused to condemn LGBT people because it believes that publicly condemning people affiliated with those identities and orientations would not help them "return to normalcy".

== Activities ==
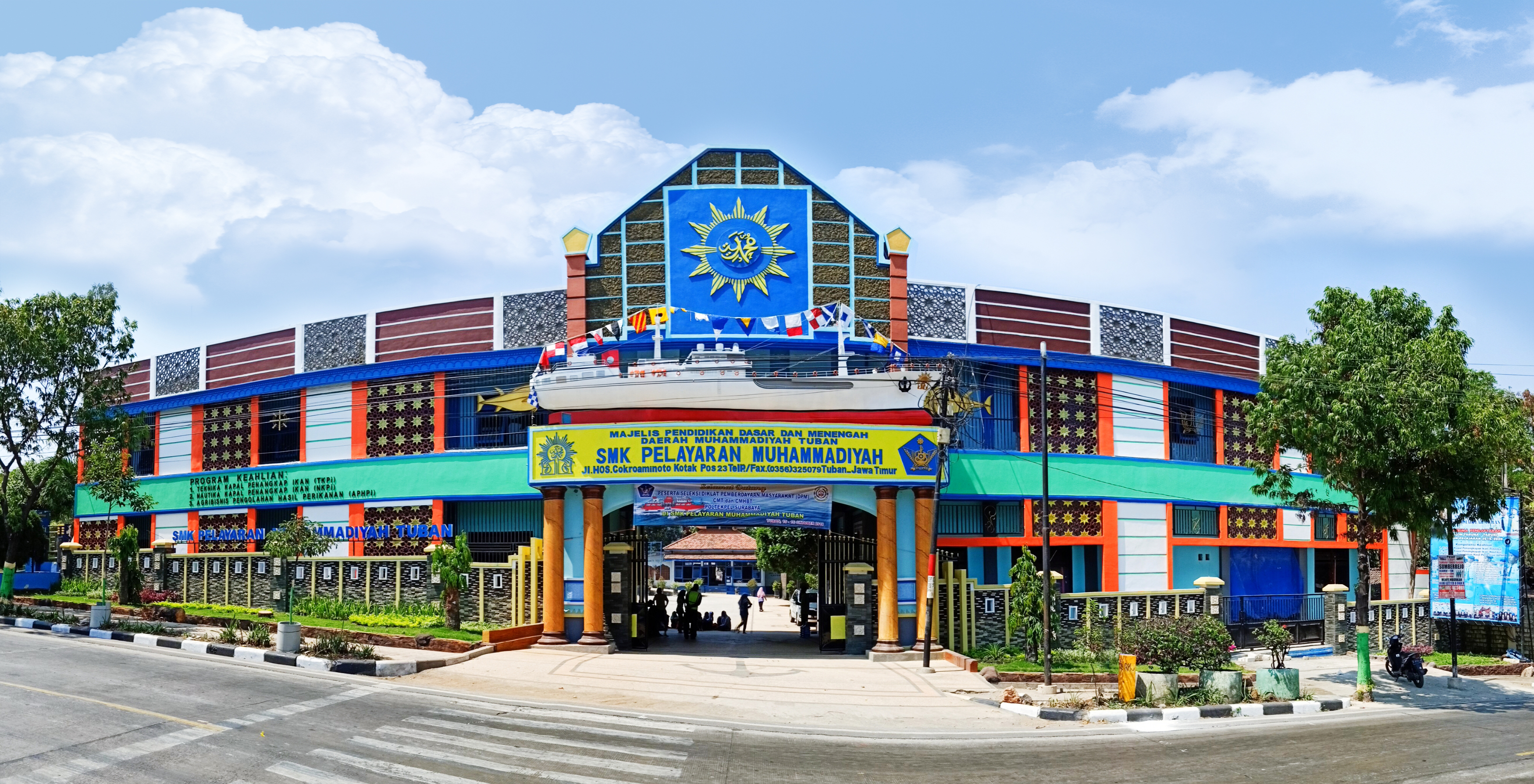
Muhammadiyah Maritime Vocational High School in Tuban, East Java

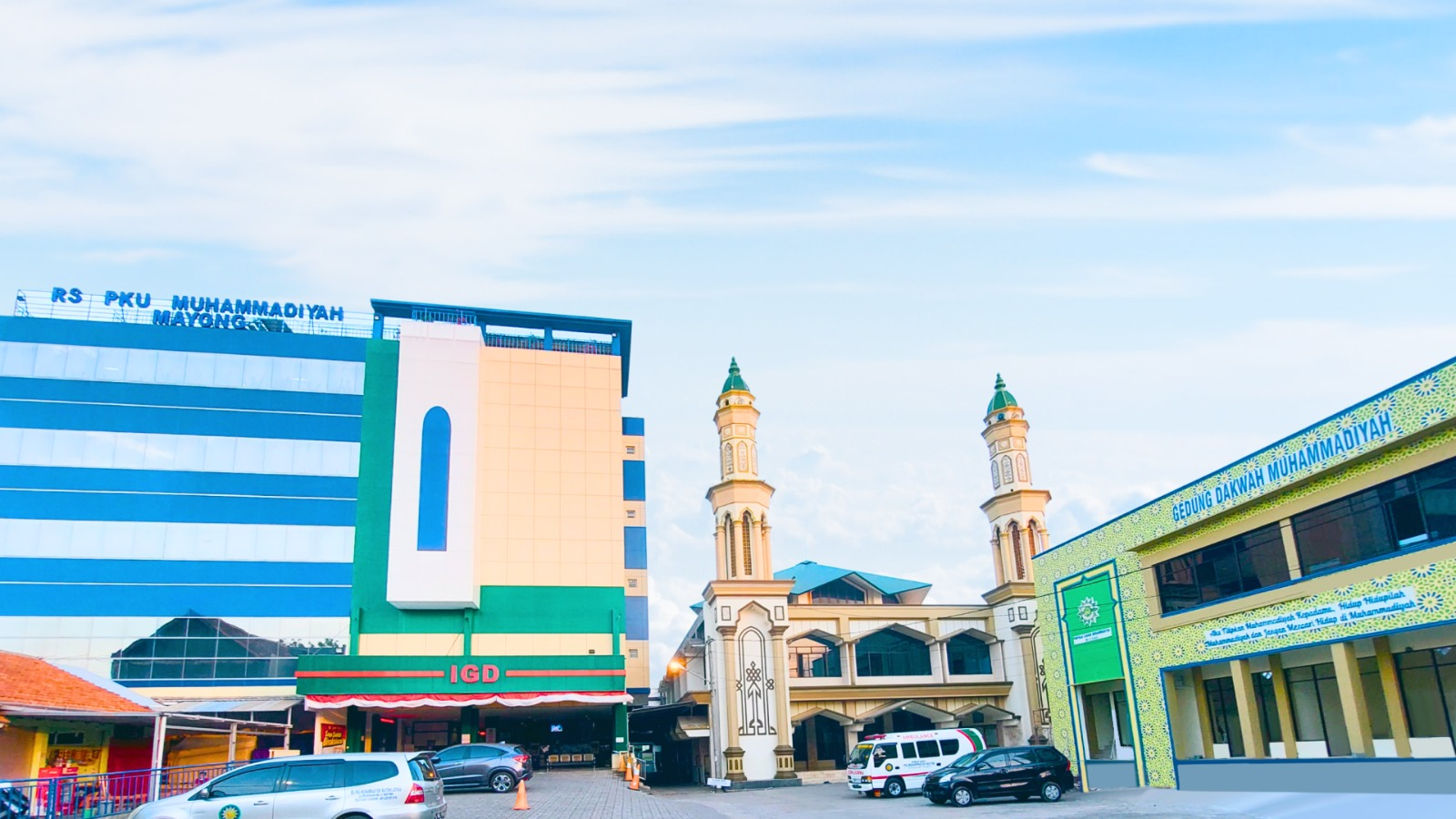
PKU Muhammadiyah Hospital of Mayong in Jepara, Central Java

Muhammadiyah is noted as a Muslim reformist organization. Its main activities are religious practice and education. It has built modern Islamic schools, differing from traditional pesantren. Some of its schools are also open to non-Muslims. In 2024, there were around 5.346 Schools/Madrasah owned by Muhammadiyah, From SD/MI (Primary), SMP/MTs (Middle), to SMA/MA/SMK (High), as well as 326 Pesantren (Boarding Schools).

Beneath the Central Board, there are Pimpinan Wilayah (PW) at the provincial level, followed by Pimpinan Daerah (PD) at the regency/city level, Pimpinan Cabang (PC) at the sub-district level, and Pimpinan Ranting (PR) at the village/urban village level. Currently, Muhammadiyah has 38 Pimpinan Wilayah (out of 38 provinces), 475 Pimpinan Daerah (out of 514 regencies/cities), 3,947 Pimpinan Cabang (out of 7,277 sub-districts), and 14,670 Pimpinan Ranting (out of 83,763 villages/urban villages) across Indonesia. Additionally, there are Pimpinan Cabang Istimewa (PCI) overseas, comprising 30 boards worldwide.

Councils

Majelis Tarjih dan Tajdid (MTT), Majelis Tabligh (MT), Majelis Pendidikan Tinggi, Penelitian, dan Pengembangan (DIKTILITBANG), Majelis Pendidikan Dasar, Menengah dan Pendidikan Nonformal (MPDM-NF), Majelis Pembinaan Kader dan Sumber Daya Insani (MPK-SDI), Majelis Pembinaan Kesejahteraan Sosial (MPKS), Majelis Ekonomi, Bisnis, dan Pariwisata (MEBP), Majelis Pemberdayaan Masyarakat (MPM), Majelis Pembina Kesehatan Umum (MPKU), Majelis Pustaka dan Informasi (MPI), Majelis Lingkungan Hidup (MLH), Majelis Hukum dan Hak Asasi Manusia (MHH), Majelis Pendayagunaan Wakaf (MPW),

Department

Lembaga Pengembangan Cabang/Ranting dan Pembinaan Masjid (LPCR-PM), Lembaga Pengembangan Pesantren (LPP), Lembaga Kajian dan Kemitraan Strategis (LKKS), Lembaga Pembina dan Pengawasan Keuangan (LPPK), Lembaga Seni Budaya (LSB), Lembaga Resiliensi Bencana (LRB) / Muhammadiyah Disaster Management Center (MDMC), Lembaga Zakat Infaq dan Shadaqah Muhammadiyah (Lazismu), Lembaga Hikmah dan Kebijakan Publik (LHKP), Lembaga Pengembangan Olahraga (LPO), Lembaga Hubungan dan Kerja Sama International (LHKSI), Lembaga Dakwah Komunitas (LDK), Lembaga Pemeriksaan Halal dan Kajian Halalan Thayyiban (LPH-KHT), Lembaga Pembinaan Haji dan Umrah (LPHU),

Lazismu

Lembaga Zakat Infaq dan Shadaqah Muhammadiyah (Lazismu), The Muhammadiyah Zakat, Infaq, and Sadaqah Institution is a Muhammadiyah-owned institution operating in the field of zakat. Lazismu was established by the Muhammadiyah Central Board in 2002 and subsequently designated as a national zakat management organization by the Minister of Religious Affairs of the Republic of Indonesia via Decree No. 1.457/21 November 2002. Following the enactment of Zakat Law Number 23 of 2011, Government Regulation Number 14 of 2014, and the Decree of the Minister of Religious Affairs of the Republic of Indonesia Number 333 of 2015, Lazismu was reaffirmed as a national zakat management organization through the Decree of the Minister of Religious Affairs of the Republic of Indonesia Number 730 in 2016.

Muhammadiyah owns around 11,473 Mosques, around 8,725 Musala (Prayer Room/Small Mosque), and Waqf Land Assets with Land Area: 214,742,677 square meters (m²).

=== Universities ===
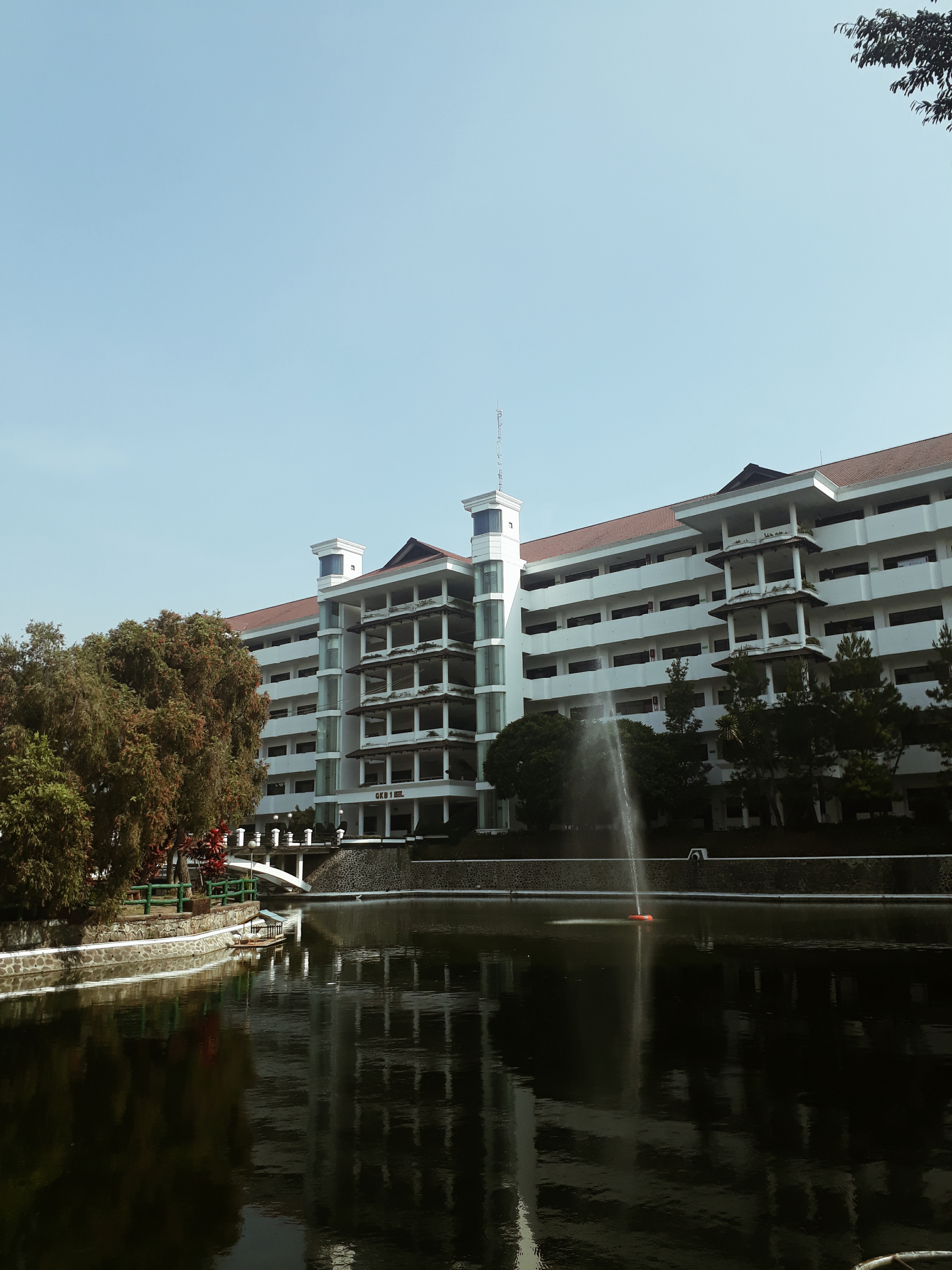
Muhammadiyah University of Malang campus in Malang, East Java

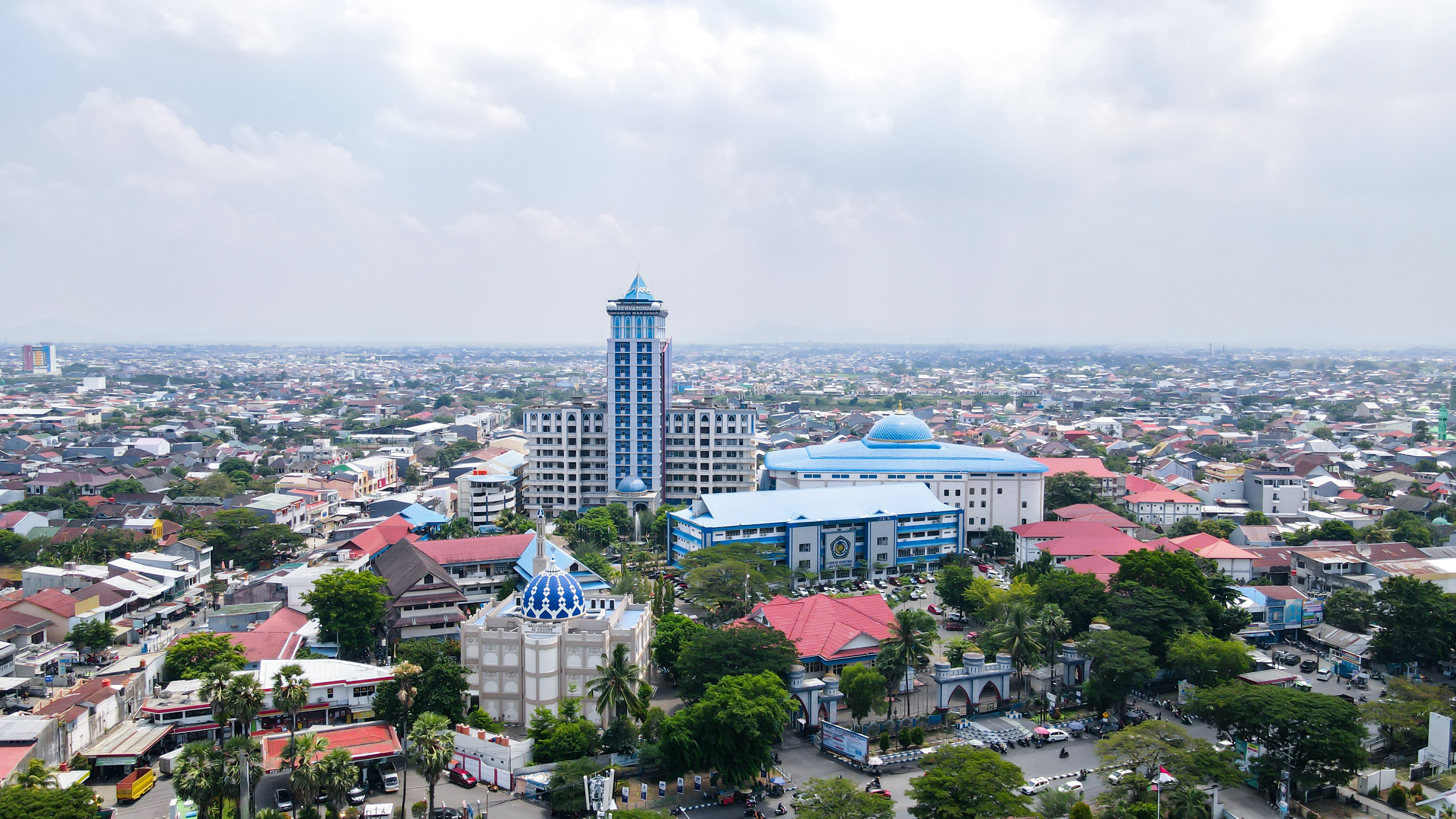
Muhammadiyah University of Makassar campus in Makassar, South Sulawesi; it has one of the tallest buildings in the city

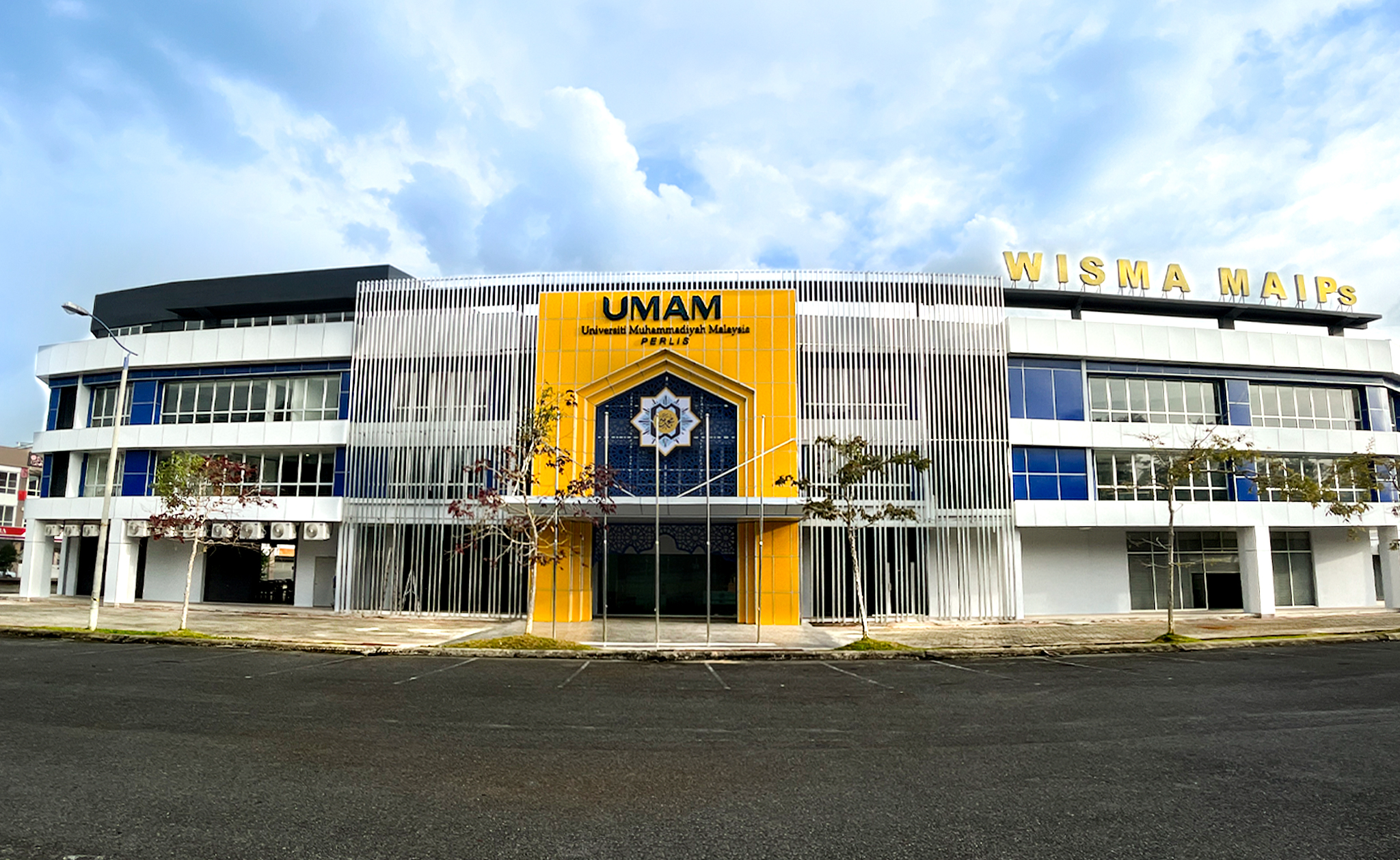
Universiti Muhammadiyah Malaysia in Perlis, Malaysia; the first Muhammadiyah university outside Indonesia

As of 2024, Muhammadiyah has 89 universities which are spread out in several provinces of Indonesia, such as:

- Ahmad Dahlan University of Yogyakarta (UAD)
- Muhammadiyah University of Malang (UMM)
- Muhammadiyah University of Yogyakarta (UMY)
- Muhammadiyah University of Surakarta (UMS)
- Muhammadiyah University of Karanganyar (UMUKA)
- Muhammadiyah University of Purwokerto
- Muhammadiyah University of Makassar (Unismuh)
- Muhammadiyah University of Magelang (UMMGL)
- Muhammadiyah University of Semarang
- Muhammadiyah University of Metro
- Muhammadiyah University of Palembang
- Muhammadiyah University of Bengkulu
- Muhammadiyah University of West Sumatra
- Muhammadiyah University of North Sumatra
- Muhammadiyah University of Aceh
- Muhammadiyah University of Cirebon
- Muhammadiyah University of Bekasi
- Muhammadiyah University of Purworejo
- Muhammadiyah University of Surabaya
- Muhammadiyah University of Sidoarjo
- Muhammadiyah University of Gresik
- Muhammadiyah University of Jember
- Muhammadiyah University of Kupang
- Muhammadiyah University of Ternate
- Muhammadiyah University of Gorontalo
- Muhammadiyah University of Jakarta
- Muhammadiyah University of Prof. Hamka (UHAMKA)
- Muhammadiyah University of Parepare
- Muhammadiyah University of Sukabumi
- Muhammadiyah University of Ponorogo
- Muhammadiyah University of Pontianak
- Muhammadiyah University of East Kalimantan (UMKT)
- Muhammadiyah University of Sorong
- Muhammadiyah University of Mataram
- Muhammadiyah University of Bima
- Universiti Muhammadiyah Malaysia (UMAM) Padang Besar, Perlis

=== Media ===
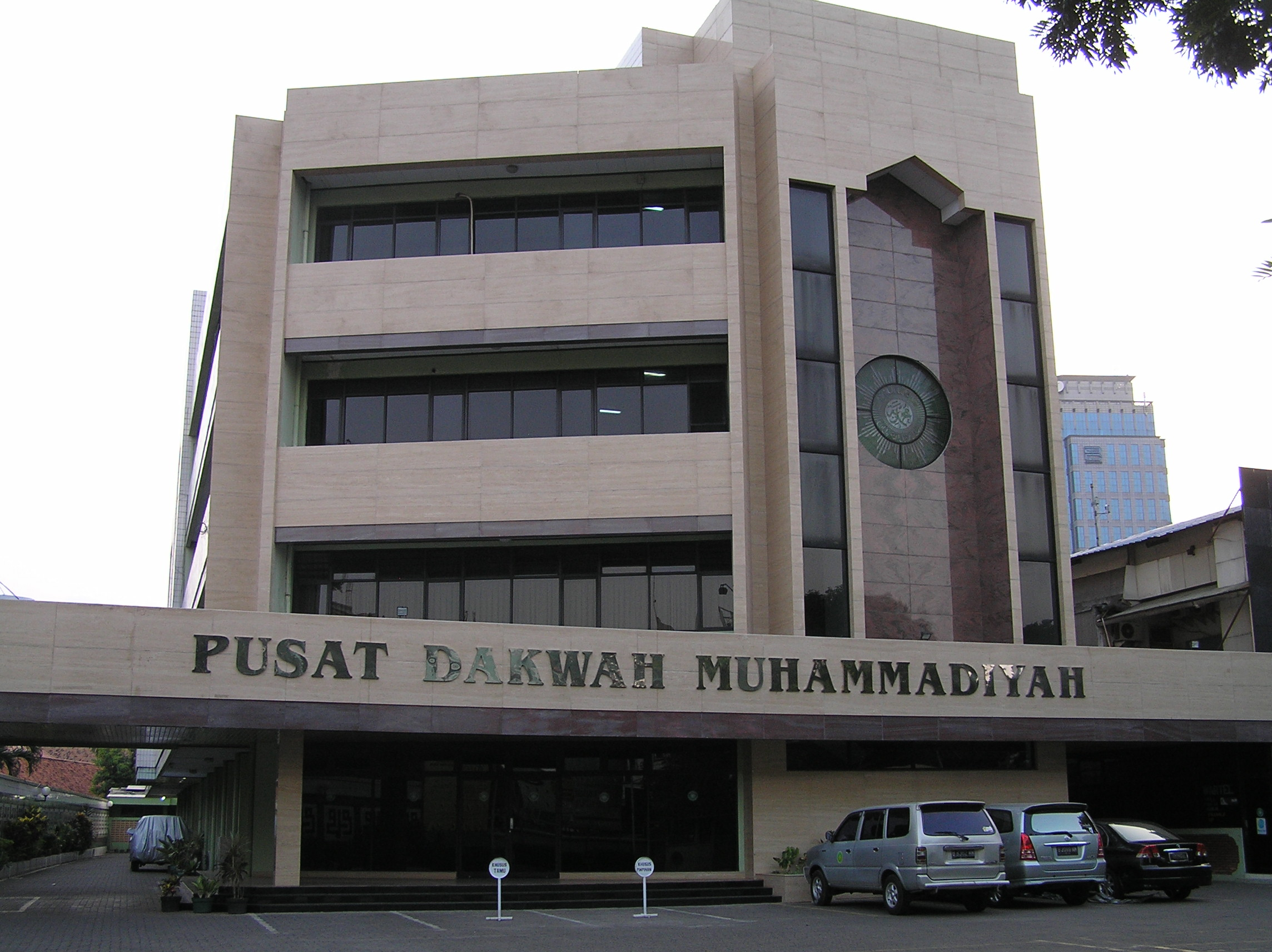
One of Muhammadiyah head offices in Jakarta

Muhammadiyah published its own magazine, Suara Muhammadiyah (English: The Voice of Muhammadiyah). Initiated by Ahmad Dahlan himself, it was first published in 1915, which makes it one of the oldest publications in Indonesia. It comtains information on the doctrine of the movement and reports on Muhammadiyah's activities.

== Organization ==
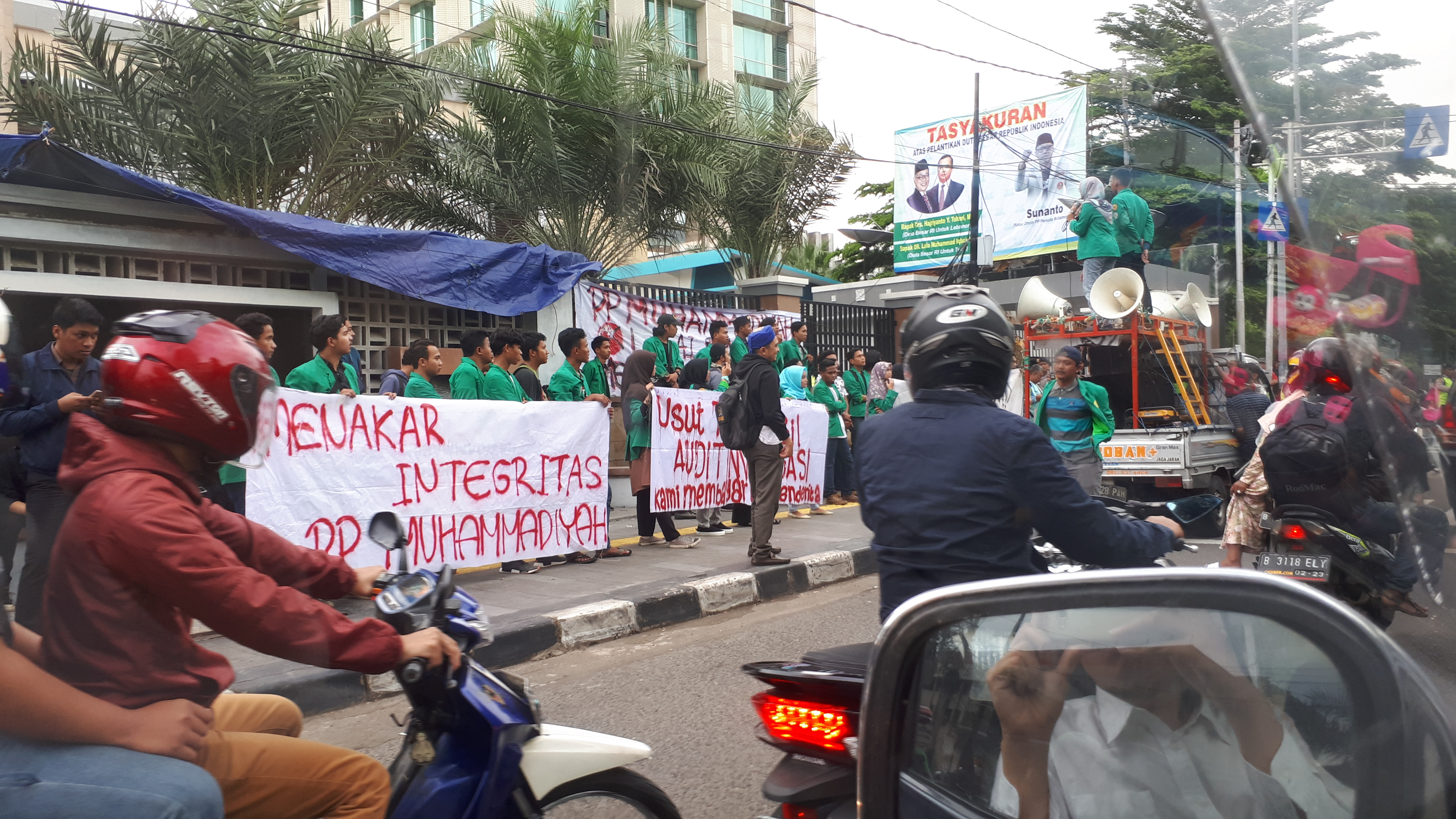
Demonstration by the youth movement of Muhammadiyah in Muhammadiyah head office

The national headquarters was originally in Yogyakarta. However, by 1970 the committees dealing with education, economics, health and social welfare had been relocated to the national capital, Jakarta.

Muhammadiyah owns several Autonomous Organizations, those being:

- Aisyiyah (women)
- Pemuda Muhammadiyah (youth)
- Nasyiatul Aisyiyah (women's youth)
- Ikatan Pelajar Muhammadiyah (students)
- Ikatan Mahasiswa Muhammadiyah (college/university students)
- Tapak Suci Putera Muhammadiyah (pencak silat martial arts)
- Hizbul Wathan (scouting).

The central committee structure consists of five advisors, a chairman several deputies, a vice chairman, a secretary general with some deputies and a treasurer with deputies.

== List of leaders ==
No.	Portrait	Name	Term start	Term end	Election Result	Ref.
1		Ahmad Dahlan	1 August 1912	23 February 1923	1912 1913 1914 1915 1916 1917 1918 1919 1920 1921 1922	
2		Ibrahim	23 February 1923	13 October 1932	1923 1924 1925 1926 1927 1928 1929 1930 1931 1932 1933	
3		Hisyam	10 November 1934	20 May 1936	1934 1935 1936	
4		Mas Mansoer	25 June 1937	25 April 1942	1937 1938 1939 1940 1941	
5		Bagoes Hadikoesoemo	24 November 1944	4 November 1953	1942 1944 1946 1950	
6		Ahmad Rasyid Sutan Mansur	4 November 1953	25 March 1959	1953 1956	
7		Yunus Anis	25 March 1959	3 June 1962	1959	
8		Ahmad Badawi	3 June 1962	25 April 1968	1962 1965	
9		Fakih Usman	25 April 1968	3 October 1968	Sept.1968	
10		Abdul Rozak Fachruddin	3 October 1968	15 December 1990	Oct.1968 1969 1971 1974 1978 1985	
11		Ahmad Azhar Basyir	15 December 1990	28 June 1995	1990	
12		Amien Rais	28 June 1995	26 April 1998	1994 1995 Amien Rais – 1,245; Sutrisno Muchdam – 1,048; Syafii Maarif – 1,047; Watik Pratiknya – 886; Rosyad Sholeh – 874; Yahya Muhaimin – 866; Ramli Thoha – 852; Asymuni Abdurrahman – 802; Mukhlas Abror – 730; Lukman Harun – 660; Anhar Burhanuddin – 628; Rusjdi Hamka – 624; Sukriyanto – 589	
13		Ahmad Syafi'i Maarif	26 April 1998	6 May 2015	1998 Unopposed 2000	
14		Din Syamsuddin	31 August 2005	8 July 2010	2005 Din Syamsuddin – 1,718; Haedar Nashir – 1,375; Muhammad Muqqodas – 1,285; A. Malik Fadjar – 1,277; Yunahar Ilyas – 1,264; Rosyad Soleh – 1,209; Ahmad Dahlan Rais – 1,135 2010 Din Syamsuddin – 1,915; Muhammad Muqoddas– 1,650; A. Malik Fadjar – 1,562; Ahmad Dahlan Rais – 1,508; Haedar Nashir – 1,482; Yunahar Ilyas – 1,431; Abdul Mu'ti – 1,322; Agung Danarto – 1,034; Syafiq A. Mughni – 952; Fatah Wibisono – 942; M Goodwill Zubir – 931; Bambang Sudibyo – 887; Syukriyanto A.R.– 797	
15		Haedar Nashir	7 May 2015	Incumbent	2015 Haedar Nashir – 1,947; Yunahar Ilyas – 1,928; Ahmad Dahlan Rais – 1,827; Busyro Muqoddas – 1,811; Abdul Mu'ti – 1,802; Anwar Abbas – 1,436; Muhadjir Effendy – 1,279; Syafiq A. Mughni – 1,198; Dadang Kahmad – 1,146; Suyatno – 1,096; Agung Danarto – 1,051; M. Goodwil Zubir– 1,049; Hajriyanto Y. Tohari– 968 2020 2-years extension 2022 Haedar Nashir – 2,203; Abdul Mu'ti – 2,159; Anwar Abbas – 1,820; Busyro Muqoddas – 1,778; Hilman Latief – 1,675; Muhadjir Effendy – 1,598; Syamsul Anwar – 1,494; Agung Danarto – 1,489; Saad Ibrahim – 1,333; Syafiq A. Mughni – 1,152; Dadang Kahmad – 1,119; Ahmad Dahlan Rais – 1,080; Irwan Akib – 1,001	

== See also ==
- Nahdatul Ulama
- Islam in Indonesia
- Pencak silat
