= Muhammadiyah University of Yogyakarta =

Private university in Yogyakarta, Indonesia

Coordinates: 7.8108°S 110.3219°E

- Universitas Muhammadiyah Yogyakarta
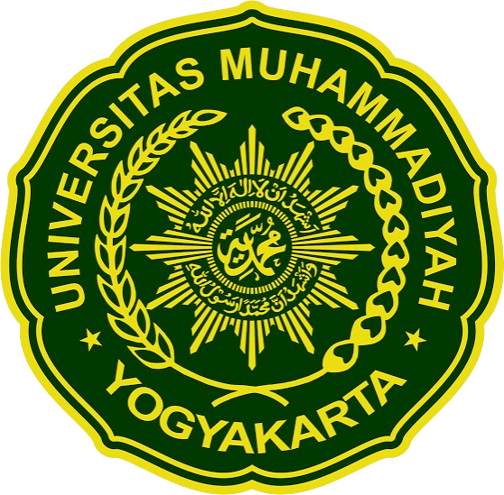
- Motto: Unggul dan Islami (Indonesian); Muda Mendunia (Indonesian)
- Motto in English: Excellent and Islamic; Young and Global
- Type: Private
- Established: March 1, 1981
- Affiliations: Muhammadiyah, Association of the Universities of Asia and the Pacific (AUAP)
- Rector: Prof. Dr. Achmad Nurmandi, M.Sc.
- Students: 19,434 students (QS WUR 2027)
- Undergraduates: 17,724 (QS WUR 2027)
- Postgraduates: 1,710 (QS WUR 2027)
- Location: Bantul Regency, Special Region of Yogyakarta, Indonesia
- Campus: Suburban
- Colors: Alizarin crimson
- Website: www.umy.ac.id

Muhammadiyah University of Yogyakarta (Indonesian: Universitas Muhammadiyah Yogyakarta; abbreviated as UMY) is a private university under affiliation of Muhammadiyah, the second largest Islamic organization in Indonesia.The Universitas Muhammadiyah Yogyakarta located in Kasihan, Bantul Regency, Special Region of Yogyakarta. Established on 1 March 1981, it is one of the higher education institutions operated by Muhammadiyah, one of Indonesia's largest Islamic organizations and it is widely recognized as one of Indonesia's leading private universities. In the 2027 QS World Universities Ranking, UMY is ranked 14th in Indonesia, 526th in Asia and 1201-1400th in the world.

== History ==
The origins of Universitas Muhammadiyah Yogyakarta (UMY) can be traced to the early 1960s, when Abdul Kahar Muzakir proposed the establishment of a Muhammadiyah university in Yogyakarta to expand the organization's contribution to higher education. On 18 November 1960, when the Muhammadiyah Central Board's Council of Education inaugurated the Faculty of Teacher Training and Education (FKIP) in Yogyakarta, its founding charter explicitly identified the faculty as part of a future Muhammadiyah university. Although the idea was well received, its realization was postponed for more than two decades because of organizational and administrative challenges.

The plan was revived in the late 1970s through the efforts of Muhammadiyah leaders and academics, including H. Mustafa Kamal Pasha, M. Alfian Darmawam, Hoemam Zainal, S.H., Brig. TNI. (Ret.) H. Bakri Shahid, Azhar KHAhmad Basir, MA, Ir.H.M. Dasron Hamid, M.Sc., HM Daim Saleh, H. Amien Rais, M.A., H.M.H. Mawardi, H. Hasan Basri, H. Abdul Rosyad Sholeh, Zuber Kohari, Ir. H. Basit Wahid, H Tubin Sakiman. Supported by KH. A. R. Fakhruddin, Chairman of the Muhammadiyah Central Board, and H. Mukhlas Abror, Chairman of the Muhammadiyah Regional Board of the Special Region of Yogyakarta, Universitas Muhammadiyah Yogyakarta was officially established on 1 March 1981 as one of Muhammadiyah's higher education institutions.

Following its establishment, retired Brigadier General Bakri Syahid, the former Rector of the State Islamic Institute (IAIN) Sunan Kalijaga, was appointed as UMY's first rector. During the university's formative years, the institution focused on establishing its organizational structure, recruiting students, and obtaining official recognition from the Indonesian government. Although Dasron Hamid had been designated to succeed the rectorship, the completion of the ministerial licensing process led to Mawardi serving as acting rector before Dasron Hamid formally assumed office.

During the 1980s and 1990s, UMY expanded its academic activities by opening new faculties and study programs while gradually developing its physical infrastructure. Initially operating from several separate campuses in Yogyakarta, the university later consolidated its academic activities at an integrated campus in Kasihan, Bantul Regency, which remains its main campus. The expansion of academic facilities and institutional capacity enabled UMY to grow into one of Indonesia's leading private universities under the Muhammadiyah organization.

In the 21st century, UMY intensified its internationalization efforts by establishing partnerships with universities abroad, introducing international programs, and increasing research collaboration and academic mobility. The university also pursued international accreditation for several study programs as part of its strategy to improve educational quality and global competitiveness. In 2019, Politeknik Muhammadiyah Yogyakarta was integrated into UMY, further strengthening its vocational education and expanding its academic portfolio.

Today, Universitas Muhammadiyah Yogyakarta offers diploma, undergraduate, professional, master's, doctoral, and specialist programs across a broad range of disciplines. As one of Muhammadiyah's higher education institutions, the university continues to develop education, research, community engagement, and international cooperation while maintaining its commitment to Islamic values and academic excellence.

== Logo and philosophy ==
The logo of Universitas Muhammadiyah Yogyakarta (UMY) is derived from the official emblem of Muhammadiyah, reflecting the university's identity as one of Muhammadiyah's higher education institutions. The emblem incorporates the Sun of Muhammadiyah, a symbol that represents enlightenment, guidance, and the dissemination of Islamic values through education, scholarship, and community service.

The Muhammadiyah Sun consists of a central sun with twelve rays surrounding the Arabic inscription of the shahada (Islamic declaration of faith). The emblem is accompanied by Qur'anic inscriptions encouraging the pursuit of knowledge and the propagation of virtue. Within the university's visual identity, the logo symbolizes the integration of Islamic values, scientific advancement, and service to society, reflecting UMY's commitment to education, research, and community engagement.

The university's official color is blue, representing integrity, professionalism, wisdom, and global outlook. The color has become an integral part of UMY's institutional identity and is consistently used across academic regalia, official publications, and university branding.

== Campus ==
=== Main Campus ===
Universitas Muhammadiyah Yogyakarta (UMY) is primarily located at an integrated campus in **Kasihan, Bantul Regency, Special Region of Yogyakarta**, approximately 7 kilometres southwest of Yogyakarta city centre. Since its gradual development during the late 1980s and 1990s, the Kasihan campus has become the university's principal centre for academic, research, administrative, and student activities. Most faculties, schools, and administrative offices are situated within the campus, together with libraries, laboratories, student residences, sports facilities, and places of worship.

The university's central administration, including the Rectorate Building, is located at the Kasihan campus. Academic facilities include faculty buildings, integrated laboratories, the UMY Central Library, the Dasron Hamid Research and Innovation Center, auditoriums, conference halls, and various student activity centres. UMY also operates the **UMY Teaching Hospital** and the **UMY Dental and Oral Hospital**, which support education, clinical training, and healthcare services for students and the wider community.

The campus is accessible by public transportation from Yogyakarta and neighbouring areas. Internal roads, pedestrian walkways, parking facilities, and open public spaces are integrated throughout the campus to support academic activities and student life. Various commercial and student support facilities, including cafeterias, cooperative stores, banking services, and sports venues, are available within the campus complex.

=== Sustainability ===
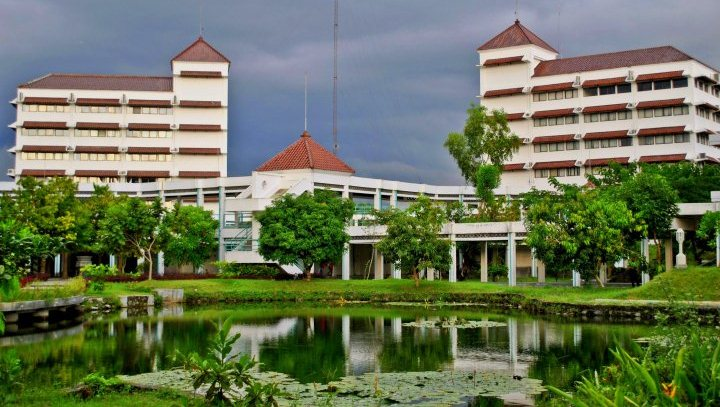
Sustainability Universitas Muhammadiyah Yogyakarta

UMY has incorporated sustainability principles into its campus development through various initiatives, including green campus planning, energy efficiency programs, waste management systems, water conservation, and the development of green open spaces. The university also participates in international sustainability assessments, including the UI GreenMetric World University Rankings, which evaluate universities based on environmental, infrastructure, and sustainability indicators.

In the UI GreenMetric World University Rankings 2025, Universitas Muhammadiyah Yogyakarta was ranked 133rd in the world and 24th in Indonesia. In addition, in the QS World University Rankings: Sustainability 2026, Universitas Muhammadiyah Yogyakarta was ranked 1071–1080 globally and 16th in Indonesia, reflecting its performance in environmental, social, and governance (ESG) indicators.

== Facilities ==
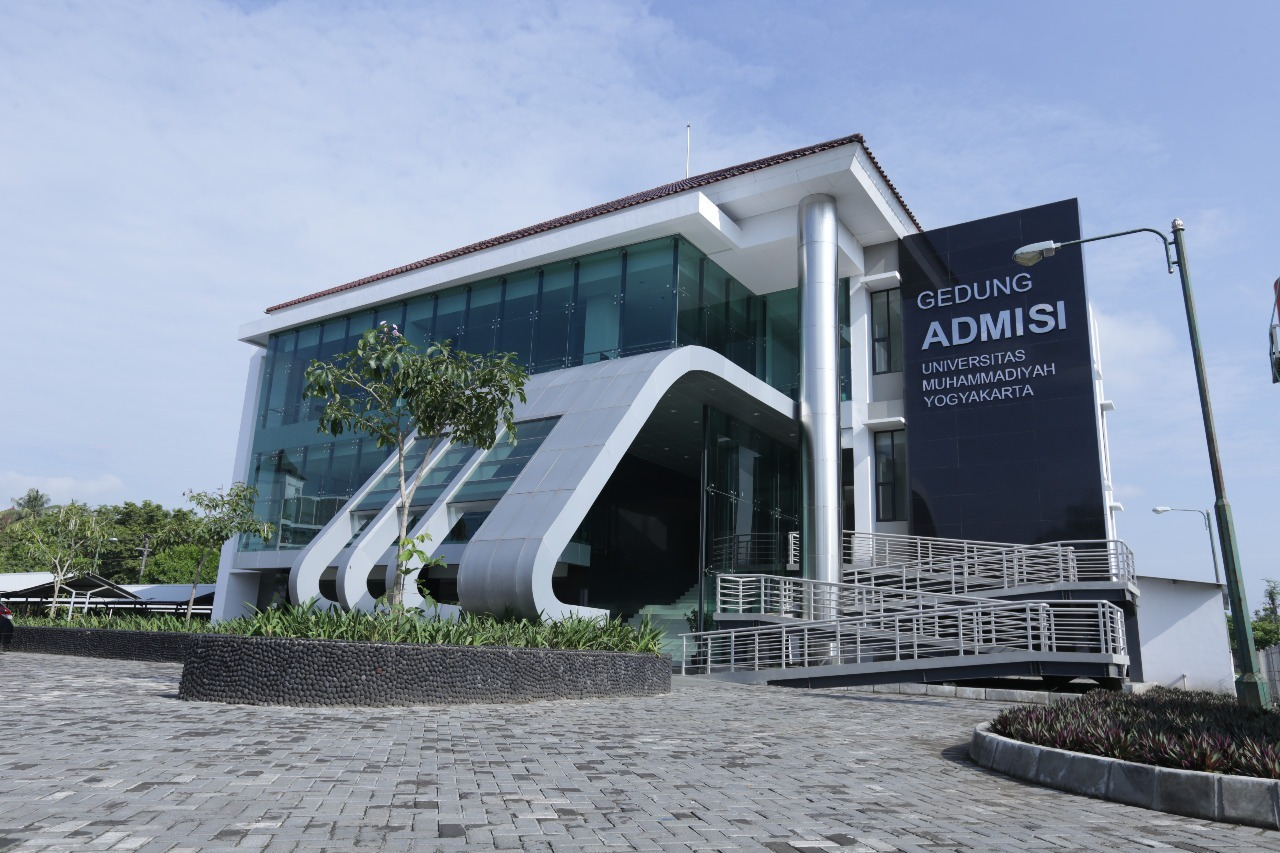
Universitas Muhammadiyah Yogyakarta Admission Building

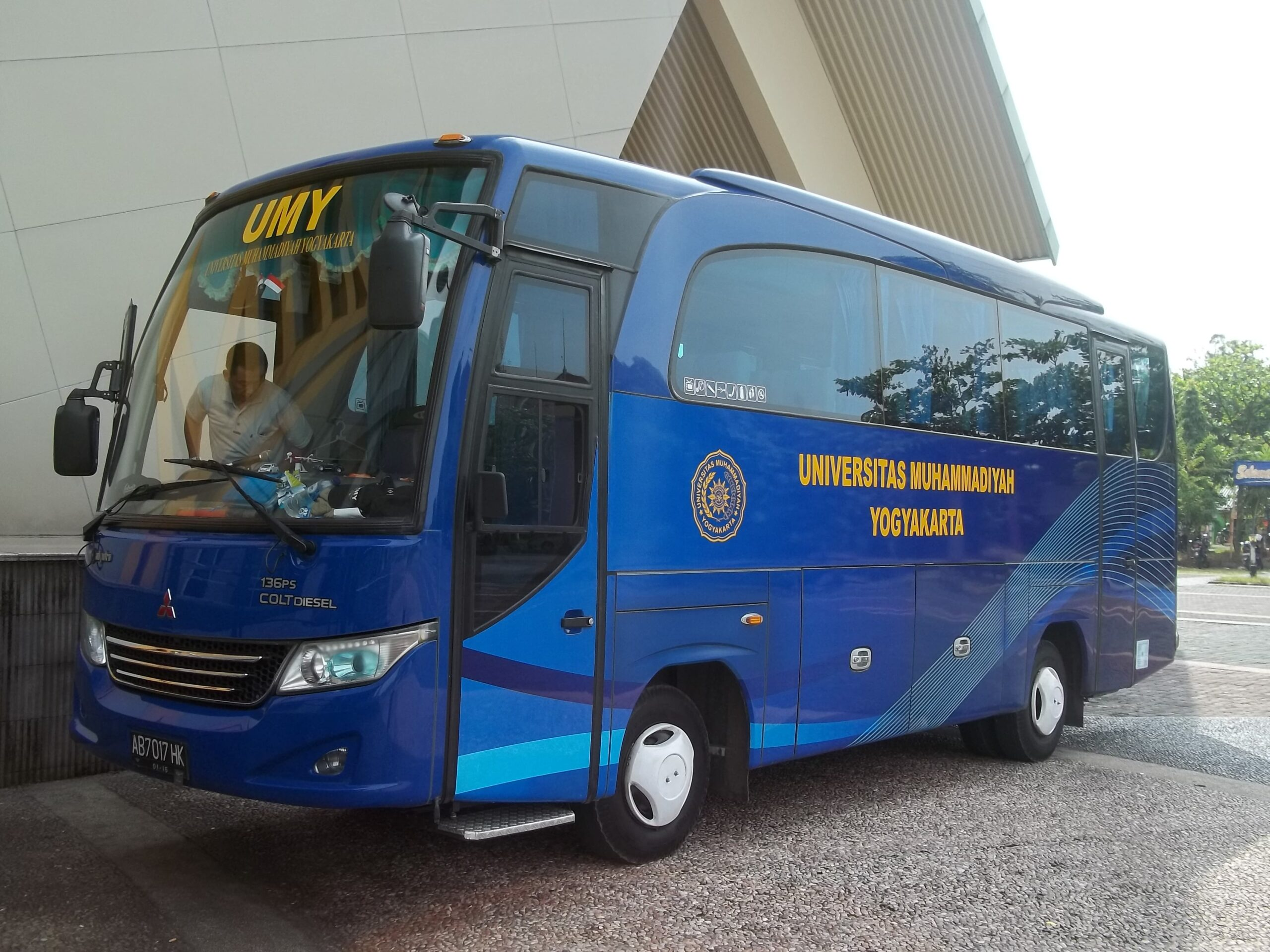
Universitas Muhammadiyah Yogyakarta Bus

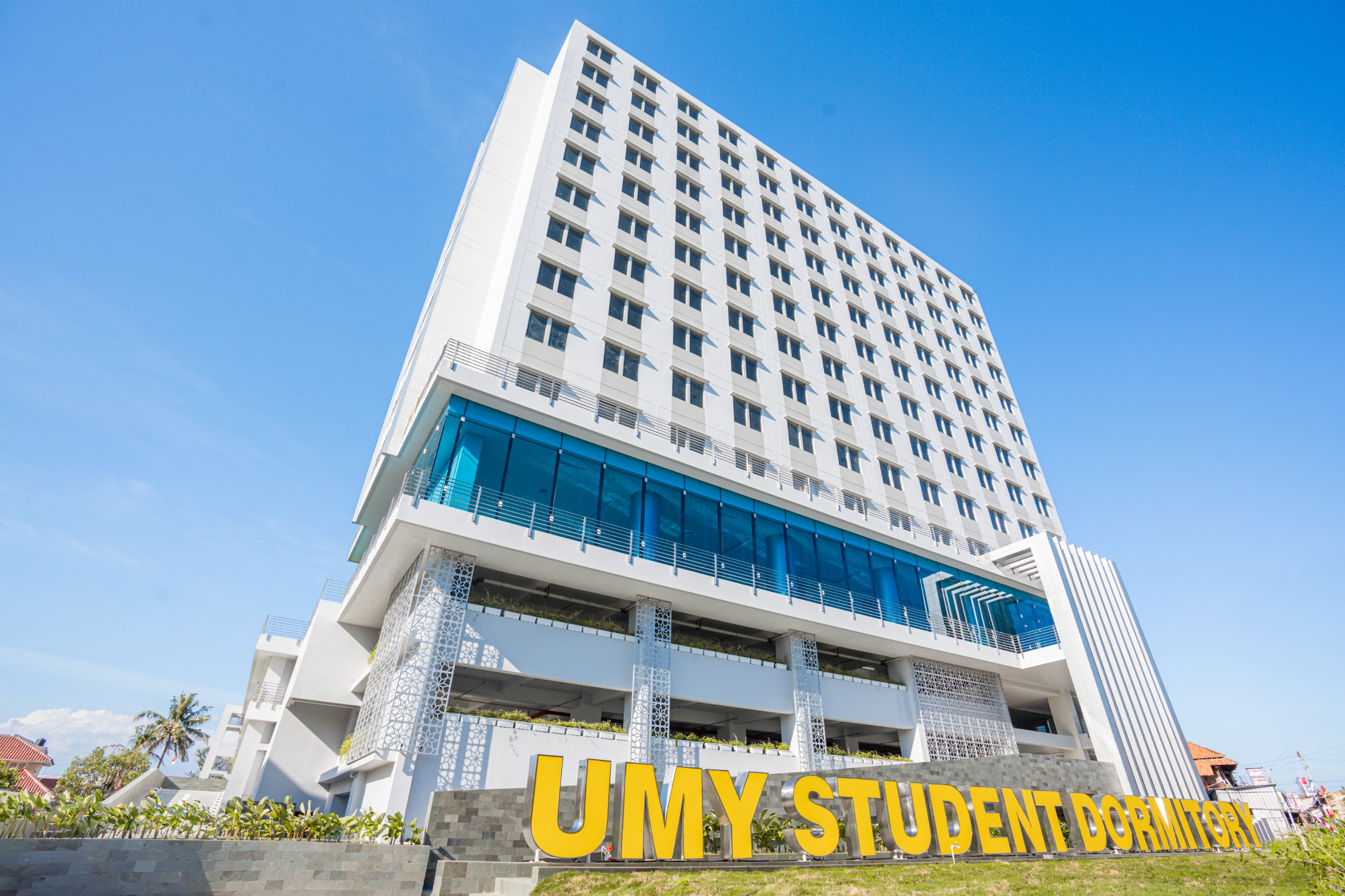
UMY Student Dormitory & Djarnawi Hadikusuma

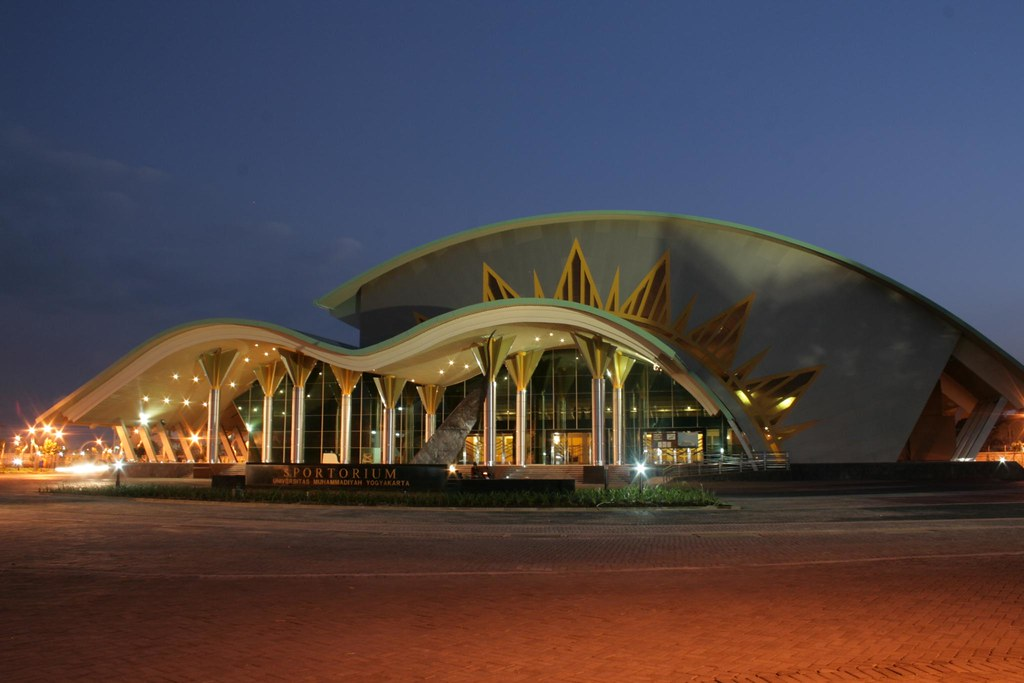
Sportorium Universitas Muhammadiyah Yogyakarta

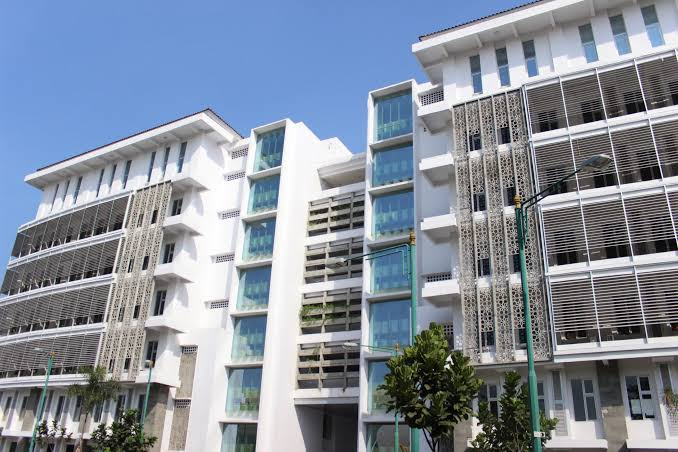
K.H. Ibrahim Building (UMY Twin Tower)

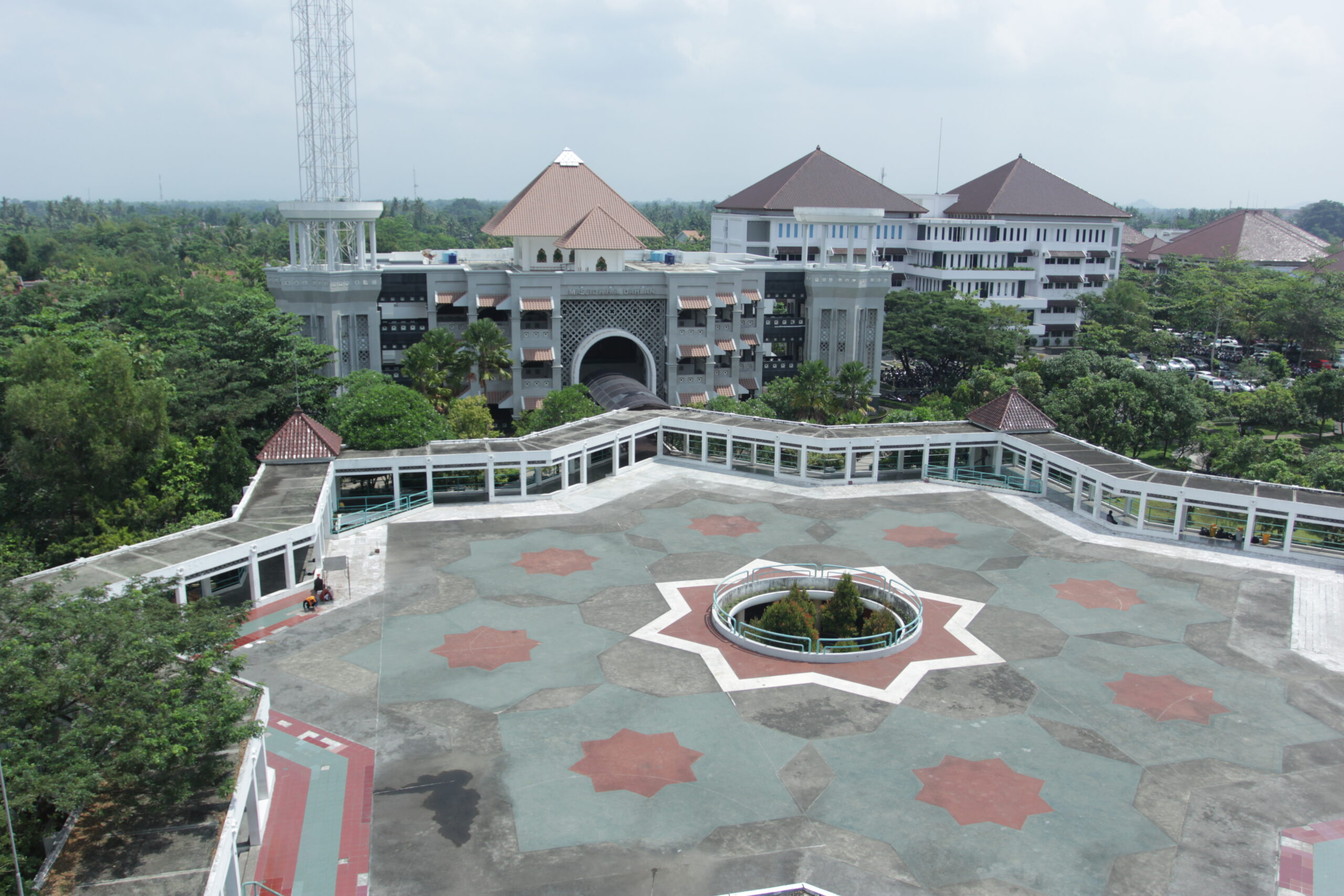
Masjid K.H. Ahmad Dahlan

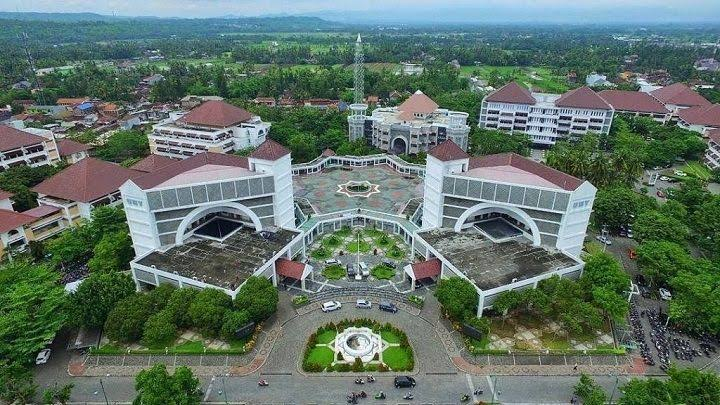
K.H Abdul Rozak Fachruddin Buildings

=== Transportation ===
Universitas Muhammadiyah Yogyakarta (UMY) provides internal transportation in the form of campus shuttle buses that connect key points across its integrated campus in Kasihan, Bantul. The shuttle system is used by students and staff to move between faculty buildings, administrative offices, and supporting facilities within the campus area. The campus layout is designed so that most academic buildings can be accessed within a short distance on foot or by shuttle transport.

The campus is also served by public transportation from Yogyakarta city, including regional bus routes and ride-hailing services. Its location along major access roads makes it relatively accessible for daily commuters from the city and surrounding areas of the Special Region of Yogyakarta.

=== Health services ===
UMY operates a university clinic that provides basic healthcare services for students and staff, including general consultations and first aid services. For more advanced medical training and healthcare services, the university is supported by its teaching hospital, UMY Teaching Hospital, which also serves the wider community and functions as a clinical training site for medical and health-related programs.

=== Sports facilities ===
The university provides a range of sports facilities within the campus area, including a football field, basketball courts, volleyball courts, and badminton courts. These facilities are used for physical education, student organization activities, and university sports events. Indoor and outdoor spaces are also available for training and recreational activities, supporting both competitive and non-competitive sports among students.

=== Student facilities ===
UMY provides several student support facilities such as multipurpose halls, seminar rooms, student activity centres, and sports complexes. These facilities are used for academic events, organizational meetings, seminars, and campus-wide activities. The university also provides supporting services such as cafeterias, cooperative stores, and banking services within the campus environment, creating a self-contained academic ecosystem for its students.

=== Library ===
The UMY Central Library is the main academic library of the university and serves students and faculty from all faculties. It provides access to printed and digital collections, including books, journals, and research publications. The library is designed to support both learning and research activities across disciplines, and also provides reading rooms, discussion areas, and digital access services.

=== Student accommodation ===
UMY provides student dormitory facilities for incoming and out-of-town students. The main dormitory complex accommodates hundreds of students (male and female separately) and is typically used by first-year students or those from outside Yogyakarta. Facilities include furnished rooms, study areas, Wi-Fi access, shared dining spaces, and 24-hour security services. The dormitory system is designed to support student adaptation during their early university years.

=== Mosque ===
The main mosque of UMY, Masjid KH Ahmad Dahlan, is located within the campus and serves as a centre for daily prayers, Friday prayers, and Islamic activities. The mosque is actively used by students and staff and also hosts religious lectures, studies, and community programs. As part of a Muhammadiyah institution, the mosque plays an important role in supporting the university’s Islamic academic environment.

== Rankings ==
University rankings

Global – Overall
- QS World: 1201-1400 (2027)
- THE World: 1501+ (2026)

Regional – Overall
- QS Asia: 526 (2026)
- THE Asia: 801+ (2026)

Universitas Muhammadiyah Yogyakarta (UMY) has been recognized in several international university ranking systems for its academic quality, research performance, and internationalization. In the QS World University Rankings 2026, UMY was ranked in the 1201–1400 band globally and 15th in Indonesia, becoming the only university within the Muhammadiyah and 'Aisyiyah Higher Education (PTMA) network to be included in the ranking.

In the Times Higher Education World University Rankings 2026, UMY was placed in the 1501+ band globally and 801+ in Asia, placing it among the Indonesian universities included in the ranking. The rankings evaluate universities based on teaching, research environment, research quality, industry engagement, and international outlook.

UMY has also gained recognition for its commitment to sustainability. In the UI GreenMetric World University Rankings 2025, the university was ranked 133rd globally and 24th in Indonesia. It was also included in the QS World University Rankings: Sustainability 2026, where it was placed in the 1071–1080 band globally and 16th nationally, reflecting its performance in environmental, social, and governance (ESG) indicators.

=== Subjects ===
THE World University Rankings by Subject 2026
Subject	Global	National
Business & economics	▼1001+	▼13
Computer science	1001+	9
Engineering	1251+	11
Law	301-400	3
Social sciences	▲801-1000	▲5

== Student life ==
=== Student organizations ===
- Student Executive Board (Badan Eksekutif Mahasiswa)
- Student Association (Himpunan Mahasiswa Jurusan)
- Islamic Student Association (Himpunan Mahasiswa Islam)
- Muhammadiyah University Students Association (Ikatan Mahasiswa Muhammadiyah)

=== Sports ===
- Aikido
- Badminton
- Basketball
- Futsal
- Soccer
- Taekwondo
- Tapak Suci
- Tennis
- Table Tennis
- Volleyball
- E-Sports

=== Clubs ===
- Arabic club
- Media and Magazines
- Choir
- Cinema and Film
- Indonesian traditional dance
- Marching Band
- Model United Nations
- Mountaineering
- Modern dance
- Student Research Community
- Music
- Photography
- Student Economic Enterprise
- Student English Activity
- Theater

== Faculties and academic programmes ==
Universitas Muhammadiyah Yogyakarta (UMY) comprises ten faculties and one graduate school, offering diploma, undergraduate, professional, master's, doctoral, and medical specialist programmes.

Faculty	Degree	Study programme	National accreditation
Faculty of Islamic Studies and Civilization	B.A.	Islamic Education	Excellent
Faculty of Islamic Studies and Civilization	B.A.	Islamic Broadcasting and Communication	Excellent
Faculty of Islamic Studies and Civilization	B.A.	Islamic Economics	Excellent
Faculty of Islamic Studies and Civilization	M.A.	Islamic Studies	Excellent
Faculty of Islamic Studies and Civilization	M.A.	Islamic Education	N/A
Faculty of Economics and Business	B.A.	Accounting	Excellent
Faculty of Economics and Business	B.A.	Economics	Excellent
Faculty of Economics and Business	B.A.	Management	Excellent
Faculty of Economics and Business	B.A.	Digital Business	N/A
Faculty of Economics and Business	M.A.	Accounting	Very Good
Faculty of Economics and Business	M.A.	Economics	Very Good
Faculty of Economics and Business	M.A.	Management	Excellent
Faculty of Economics and Business	Ph.D.	Management	Excellent
Faculty of Economics and Business	Ph.D.	Accounting	N/A
Faculty of Law	LL.B.	Law	Excellent
Faculty of Law	LL.M.	Law	Excellent
Faculty of Law	Ph.D.	Law	N/A
Faculty of Social and Political Sciences	B.A.	International Relations	Excellent
Faculty of Social and Political Sciences	B.A.	Digital Governance and Public Policy	Excellent
Faculty of Social and Political Sciences	B.A.	Communication Science	Excellent
Faculty of Social and Political Sciences	M.A.	International Relations	Excellent
Faculty of Social and Political Sciences	M.A.	Digital Governance and Public Policy	Excellent
Faculty of Social and Political Sciences	M.A.	Media and Communication	Temporary Accreditation
Faculty of Social and Political Sciences	Ph.D.	Digital Governance and Public Policy	Very Good
Faculty of Social and Political Sciences	Ph.D.	Islamic Politics	Excellent
Faculty of Social and Political Sciences	Ph.D.	International Relations	N/A
Faculty of Medicine and Health Sciences	M.D.	Medicine	Excellent
Faculty of Medicine and Health Sciences	B.Nurs.	Nursing	Excellent
Faculty of Medicine and Health Sciences	B.Pharm.	Pharmacy	Excellent
Faculty of Medicine and Health Sciences	Professional	Medical Doctor	Excellent
Faculty of Medicine and Health Sciences	Professional	Nursing Profession	Excellent
Faculty of Medicine and Health Sciences	Professional	Pharmacist	Excellent
Faculty of Medicine and Health Sciences	M.Nurs.	Nursing	Excellent
Faculty of Medicine and Health Sciences	M.H.A.	Hospital Administration	Excellent
Faculty of Dentistry	D.D.S.	Dentistry	Excellent
Faculty of Dentistry	Professional	Dentist Profession	Excellent
Faculty of Education and Humanities	B.Ed.	English for Digital and Global Education	Excellent
Faculty of Education and Humanities	B.Ed.	Japanese Intercultural Communication	Very Good
Faculty of Education and Humanities	B.Ed.	Arabic Education	Excellent
Faculty of Education and Humanities	B.Ed.	Sports Coaching Education	Initial Accreditation
Faculty of Education and Humanities	Professional	Teacher Professional Education	Good
Faculty of Agriculture	B.Agr.	Agribusiness	Excellent
Faculty of Agriculture	B.Agr.	Agrotechnology	Excellent
Faculty of Engineering	Diploma	Medical Electronics Technology	Very Good
Faculty of Engineering	Applied Bachelor's	Automotive Engineering Technology	Good
Faculty of Engineering	B.Eng.	Artificial Intelligence	N/A
Faculty of Engineering	B.Eng.	Electrical and Intelligent Systems Engineering	Excellent
Faculty of Engineering	B.Eng.	Software Engineering and Network Security	Excellent
Faculty of Engineering	B.Eng.	Mechanical Engineering	Excellent
Faculty of Engineering	B.Eng.	Civil Engineering	Excellent
Faculty of Engineering	M.Eng.	Civil Engineering	Good
Faculty of Engineering	Professional	Professional Engineer Programme	Excellent
Faculty of Psychology	B.Psych.	Psychology	N/A
Graduate School	Ph.D.	Islamic Educational Psychology	Excellent

=== International programmes ===
UMY offers International Programme (IP) classes in several undergraduate programmes. The programmes are conducted partially or entirely in English and include opportunities for student exchanges, international internships, overseas community service, and dual-degree or joint academic activities with partner universities.

Faculty	Degree	Programme	International Programme	International accreditation
Faculty of Islamic Studies and Civilization	B.A.	Islamic Broadcasting and Communication	Yes	–
Faculty of Economics and Business	B.A.	Accounting	Yes	FIBAA
Faculty of Economics and Business	B.A.	Economics	Yes	FIBAA
Faculty of Economics and Business	B.A.	Management	Yes	FIBAA, AUN-QA
Faculty of Economics and Business	M.A.	Management	No	FIBAA
Faculty of Law	LL.B.	Law	Yes	FIBAA
Faculty of Social and Political Sciences	B.A.	International Relations	Yes	FIBAA
Faculty of Social and Political Sciences	B.A.	Digital Governance and Public Policy	Yes	FIBAA, AUN-QA
Faculty of Social and Political Sciences	B.A.	Communication Science	Yes	–
Faculty of Social and Political Sciences	M.A.	International Relations	No	FIBAA
Faculty of Social and Political Sciences	M.A.	Digital Governance and Public Policy	No	FIBAA
Faculty of Medicine and Health Sciences	B.Nurs.	Nursing	No	ASIIN
Faculty of Medicine and Health Sciences	M.Nurs.	Nursing	No	ASIIN
Faculty of Medicine and Health Sciences	M.D.	Medicine	No	WFME*
Faculty of Medicine and Health Sciences	B.Pharm.	Pharmacy	No	WFME*
Faculty of Medicine and Health Sciences	Professional	Medical Doctor	No	WFME*
Faculty of Medicine and Health Sciences	Professional	Nursing Profession	No	WFME*
Faculty of Medicine and Health Sciences	Professional	Pharmacist	No	WFME*
Faculty of Medicine and Health Sciences	M.H.A.	Hospital Administration	No	FIBAA
Faculty of Dentistry	D.D.S.	Dentistry	No	WFME*
Faculty of Dentistry	Professional	Dentist Profession	No	WFME*
Faculty of Agriculture	B.Agr.	Agribusiness	No	ASIIN
Faculty of Agriculture	B.Agr.	Agrotechnology	No	ASIIN, AUN-QA
Faculty of Engineering	B.Eng.	Civil Engineering	Yes	IABEE, AUN-QA

Notes

- AUN-QA – ASEAN University Network – Quality Assurance
- ASIIN – Accreditation Agency for Degree Programmes in Engineering, Informatics, Natural Sciences and Mathematics (Germany)
- FIBAA – Foundation for International Business Administration Accreditation (Switzerland)
- IABEE – Indonesian Accreditation Board for Engineering Education
- WFME – World Federation for Medical Education Recognition Programme

== International partnerships ==
Universitas Muhammadiyah Yogyakarta (UMY) maintains academic partnerships with more than 320 universities and higher education institutions across Asia, Europe, North America, Oceania, Africa, and Latin America through student exchanges, collaborative research, dual-degree programmes, academic mobility, and institutional cooperation.

Region	Country	Partner university	QS World University Rankings 2027
Asia	Japan	Kyushu University	101
Asia	Japan	Ritsumeikan University	441
Asia	Japan	Yamagata University	801–850
Asia	South Korea	Yonsei University	56
Asia	South Korea	Korea University	61
Asia	South Korea	Kyung Hee University	252
Asia	China	Zhengzhou University	451
Asia	China	Henan University	901–950
Asia	Taiwan	National Cheng Kung University	203
Asia	Malaysia	University of Malaya	56
Asia	Malaysia	Universiti Sains Malaysia	134
Asia	Malaysia	International Islamic University Malaysia	711–720
Asia	Thailand	Chulalongkorn University	216
Asia	Thailand	Thammasat University	575
Asia	Singapore	Singapore Polytechnic	—N/a
Asia	Turkey	Istanbul University	591–600
Europe	United Kingdom	Swansea University	292
Europe	Germany	University of Münster	356
Europe	Netherlands	Eindhoven University of Technology	124
Europe	France	Université Savoie Mont Blanc	1001–1200
Europe	Spain	Jaume I University	801–850
Europe	Poland	Adam Mickiewicz University in Poznań	741–750
North America	United States	University of Maryland, College Park	218
North America	United States	Northern Arizona University	1001–1200
North America	Canada	College of New Caledonia	—N/a
Oceania	Australia	Griffith University	255
Oceania	Australia	Flinders University	336
Africa	Egypt	Suez Canal University	1201–1400
Africa	Morocco	Ibn Tofail University	1001–1200
Latin America	Mexico	CETYS University	1201–1400

== Notable alumni ==
- Fahd Pahdepie, (International Relations, 2009), Writer, entrepreneur, and philanthropist
- Lalu Muhammad Iqbal, (International Relations, 1996), Indonesian diplomat. Ambassador of the Republic of Indonesia to the Republic of Turkey (2019-2021)

== See also ==
- List of Islamic educational institutions
