= Aisyiyah =

Islamic organization based in Yogyakarta, Indonesia

- Seal of Aisyiyah

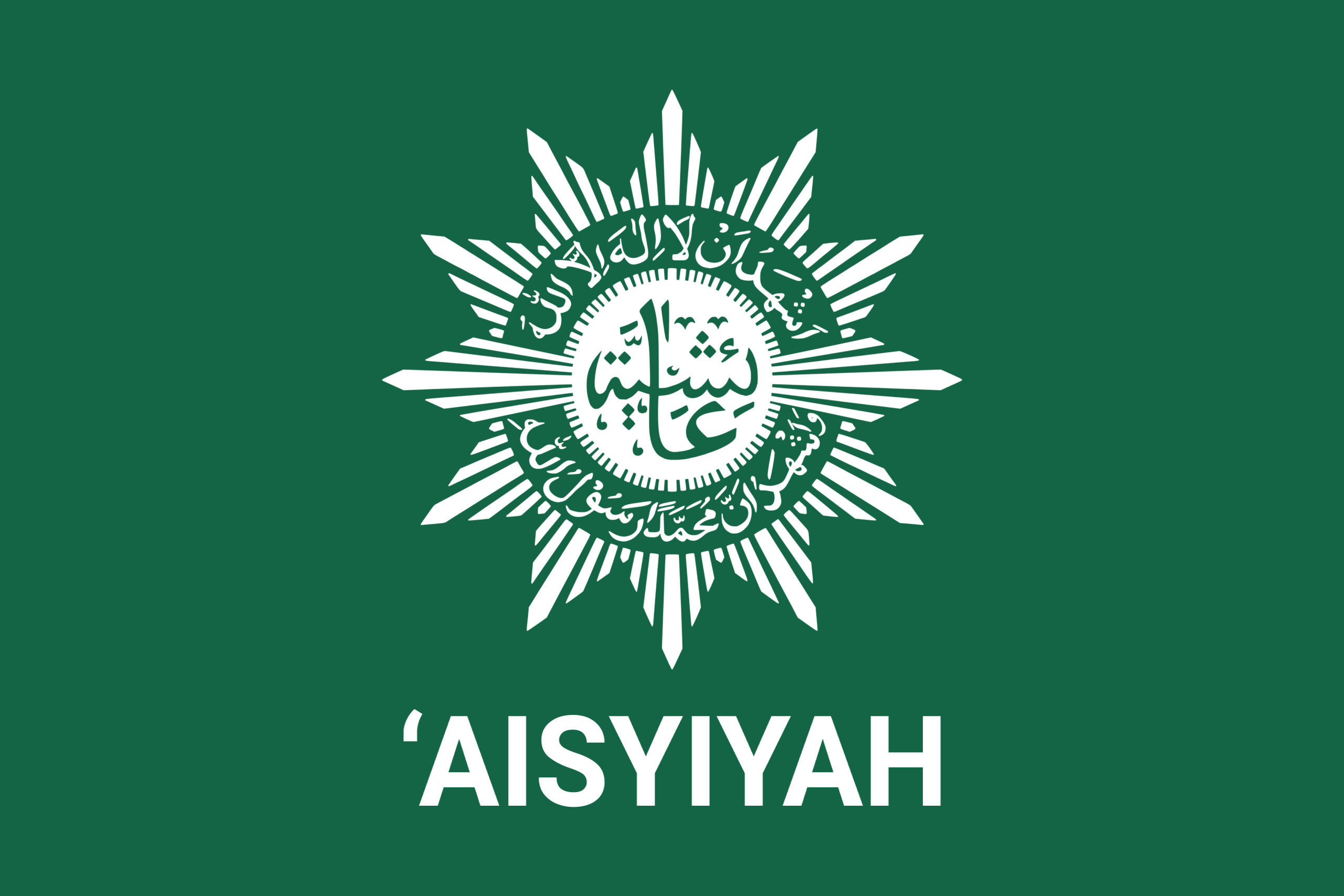
- Flag of Aisyiyah
- Formation: 19 May 1917
- Type: Islamic women organization
- Purpose: Socio-religious
- Headquarters: Yogyakarta, Indonesia
- Region served: Indonesia
- Leader: Dr. apt. Salmah Orbayinah, M. Kes.
- Parent organization: Muhammadiyah
- Website: Official website

Aisyiyah (Arabic: عائشية, romanized: ʿĀʾishiyah, lit. 'followers of Aisha') is an Islamic non-governmental organization in Indonesia under Muhammadiyah, dedicated to female empowerment and charitable work. It was formed on 19 May 1917 by Nyai Ahmad Dahlan to facilitate women's access to education, health care and social services. The organization provides micro-loan and small business development support, family planning services, maternal and pediatric care, orphanages, training for female Muslim clerics, and standard preschool through university level education. These social services end at death, whereby the organization provides female morticians so that female bodies do not need to be prepared for burial by men. Aisyiyah manages several hundred healthcare centers in Indonesia as well as three branches in Egypt, Malaysia and the Netherlands. The organization's stated goal is to make Islamic society a reality for women, and it encourages its members to seek further education even if they become "smarter than their husbands."

Aisyiyah faces opposition to their work from two sources: traditional Javanese culture with its pre-Islamic practices and the minority of Indonesians who study Islam in the Middle East both display negative attitudes toward women in the public space.

== History ==
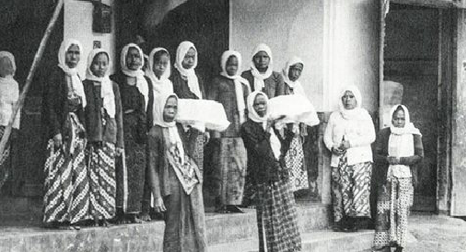
Aisyiyah members in 1928

Aisyiyah's efforts initially focused on female literacy for the sake of reading the Qur'an. The organization opened the first Indonesian Islamic preschool in Kauman in 1919, the organization's own first teacher college in 1922, and its first worship hall in the same city in 1923, wherein a female imam led an all-female congregation. Much of the organization's early activity was also based on economic rights. Women in Indonesia often work at similar jobs to men, and thus Aisyiyah emphasized women's right to rest and refuse work as well as the connection between religious piety and work ethic. The organization's support for female leadership from 1978 also predated wider national debate on the topic in the 1990s, and by 1999 Aisyiyah had publicly endorsed the idea of a female leader of the national government.

Aisyiyah has been noted for relatively early action in modern Indonesia's civil society. In addition to being the first Muslim women's organization in the country, it also promoted women's literacy at a time when most of the population in general was illiterate. Its members wore the Muslim headscarf at a time when the practice was not yet the norm in Indonesia, and although their vocational schools taught Islamic moral values, their schools were also coeducational unlike the gender-segregated religious schools of the Middle East.

== Membership ==
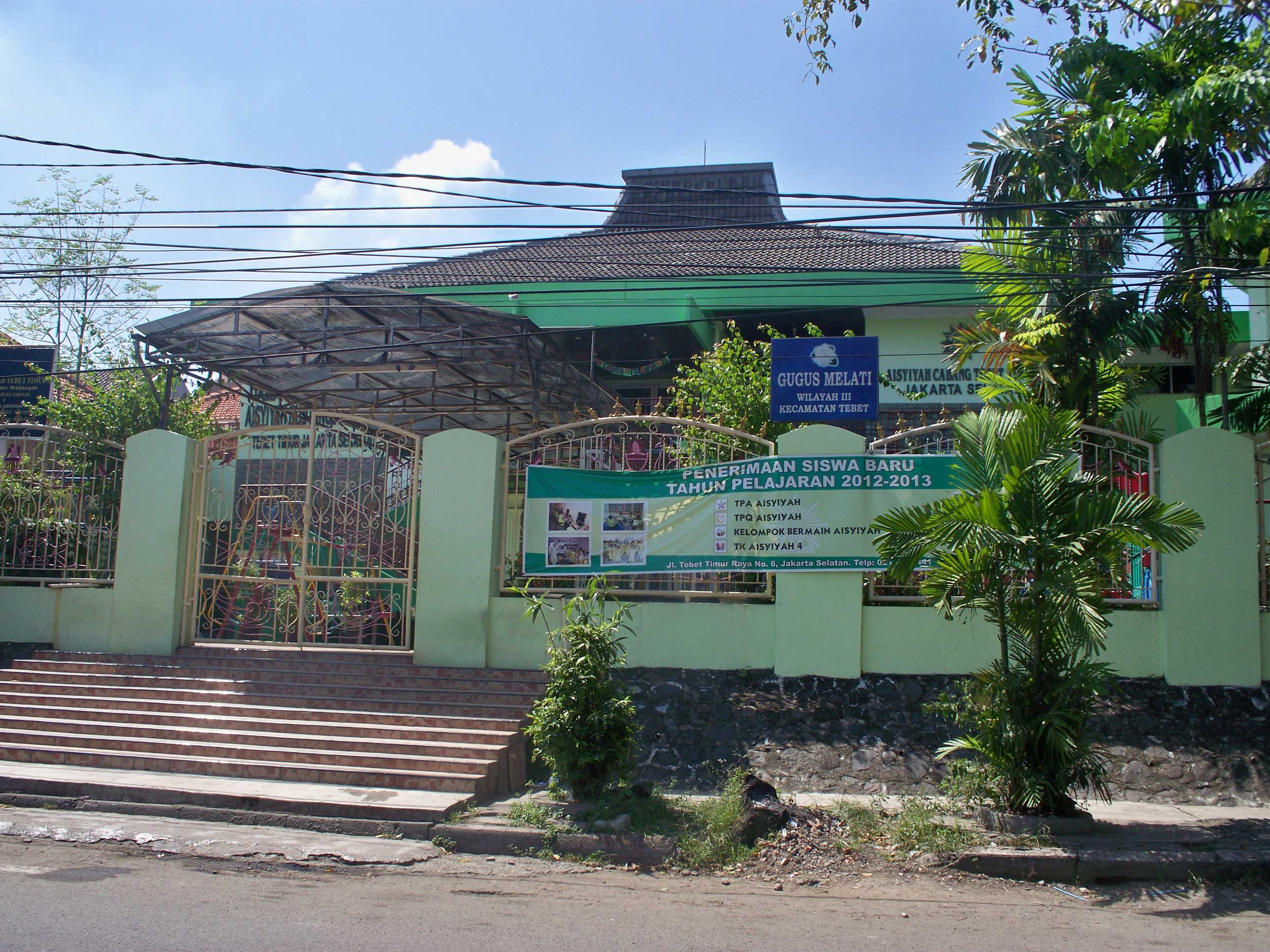
An Aisyiyah kindergarten ('Aisyiyah Bustanul Athfal or ABA) in Jakarta. The organization now operates over 22,000 kindergartens as of 2021, mostly in Indonesia.

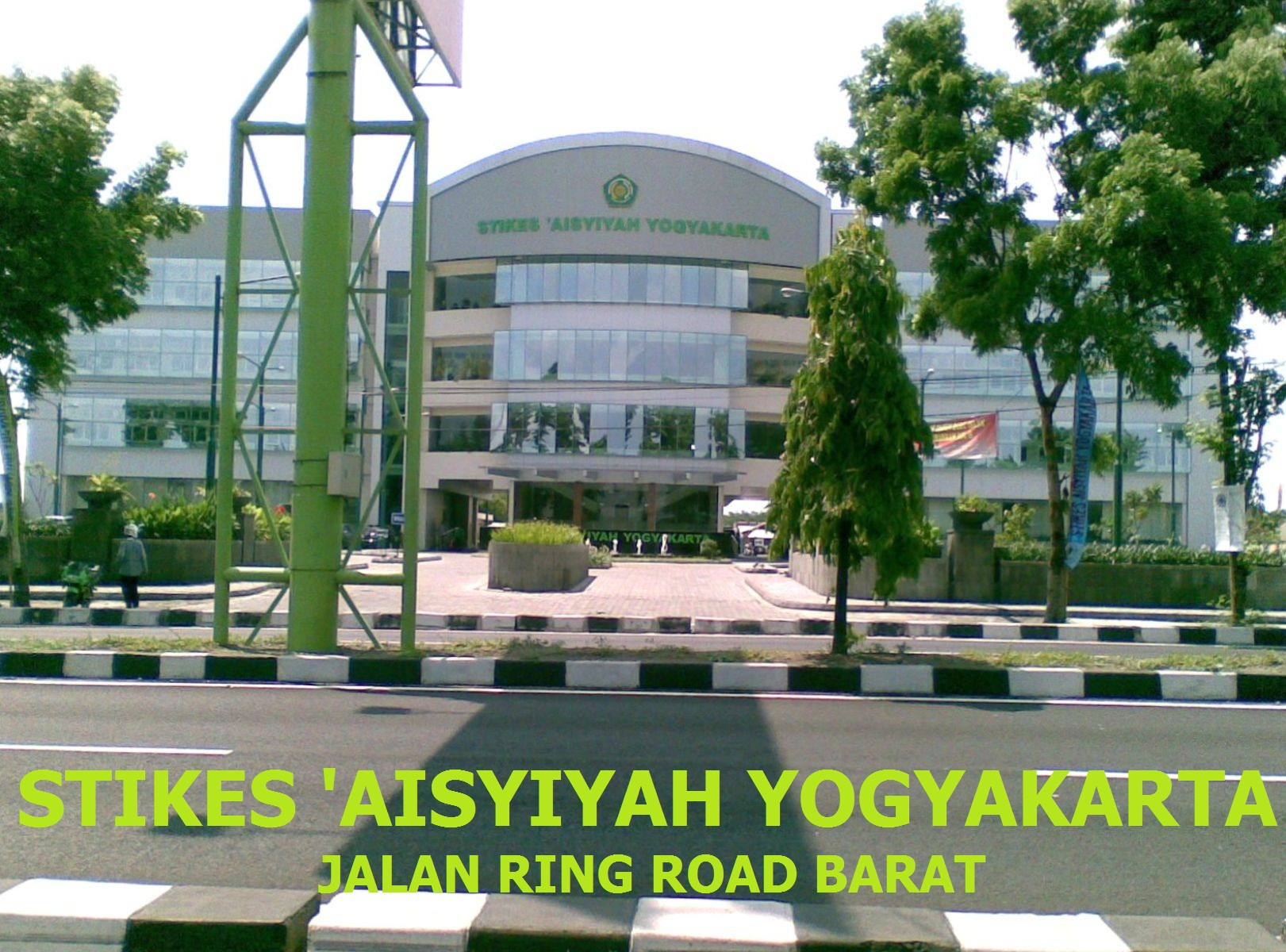
Campus of Aisyiyah Institute of Health Sciences of Yogyakarta in Sleman Regency, Special Region of Yogyakarta, now Aisyiyah University of Yogyakarta

All members of Aisyiyah take a vow upon reception of their membership card to uphold the organization's tenets and protect its image as a pious group. Extra devotion beyond what is considered the minimum in Islamic doctrine, such as nafl prayer, is the normal practice for most of its members. Although Aisyiyah was founded to fulfill the goal of religious purification rather than women's emancipation, the organization has been able to exert influence on religious discourse in Indonesia. Although its parent organization, Muhammadiyah, did not officially permit birth control until 1971, it was the efforts of Aisyiyah's female Muslim clerics and study circles that shaped the view of permissibility on the issue.
