= Tapak Suci =

Indonesian style of Pencak Silat

Tapak Suci Putera Muhammadiyah
- Type: Pencak silat organization
- Headquarters: Yogyakarta
- Location: Indonesia
- Owner: Muhammadiyah
- Website: tapaksuci.or.id

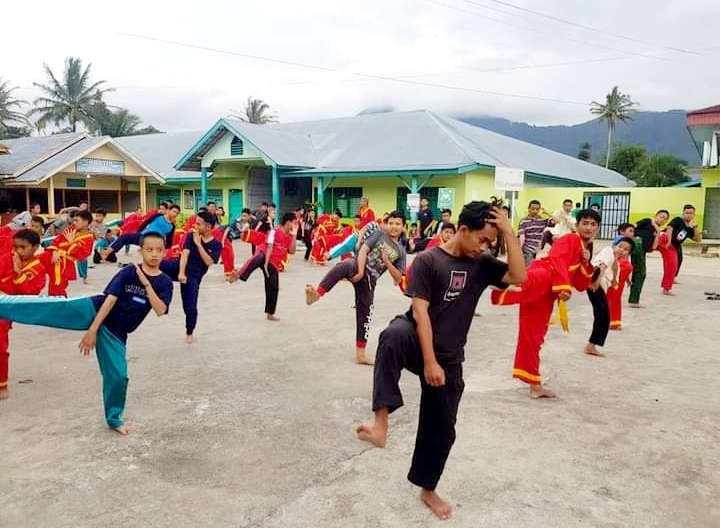
The santri of PPTQM Pakan Sinayan in Agam Regency, West Sumatra, Indonesia doing the Tapak Suci exercise

Tapak Suci Putera Muhammadiyah (lit. 'Sacred Palm, Sons of Muhammadiyah'), shortened as Tapak Suci, is an autonomous pencak silat martial arts organization of Muhammadiyah, the modernist, second largest Muslim organization in Indonesia. Tapak Suci is one of the ten 'historic schools' of IPSI (Ikatan Pencak Silat Indonesia, or Pencak Silat Association of Indonesia), the leading organization of pencak silat in Indonesia.

The silat school was founded and made an official part of Muhammadiyah on July 31, 1963, in Yogyakarta and has since spread nationwide within the organization. The silat masters and practitioners in Muhammadiyah were concerned about the threatening situation confronting their members at that time, especially from various mass organizations that belonged to the Communist Party of Indonesia (PKI).

Tapak Suci trains its members in physical silat techniques and breathing exercises. The school, however, does not teach body invulnerability (ilmu kebal, which is taught by some more traditional silat schools), as it opposes cults and considers them shirk.

As an autonomously managed part of Muhammadiyah, the martial arts school is open to membership not only of Muslims but to anyone interested, either in Indonesia or overseas chapters.

== See also ==
- Muhammadiyah
- Pencak silat
- Styles of silat
