= Soedjatmoko =

Indonesian politician, intellectual, and diplomat (1922–1989)

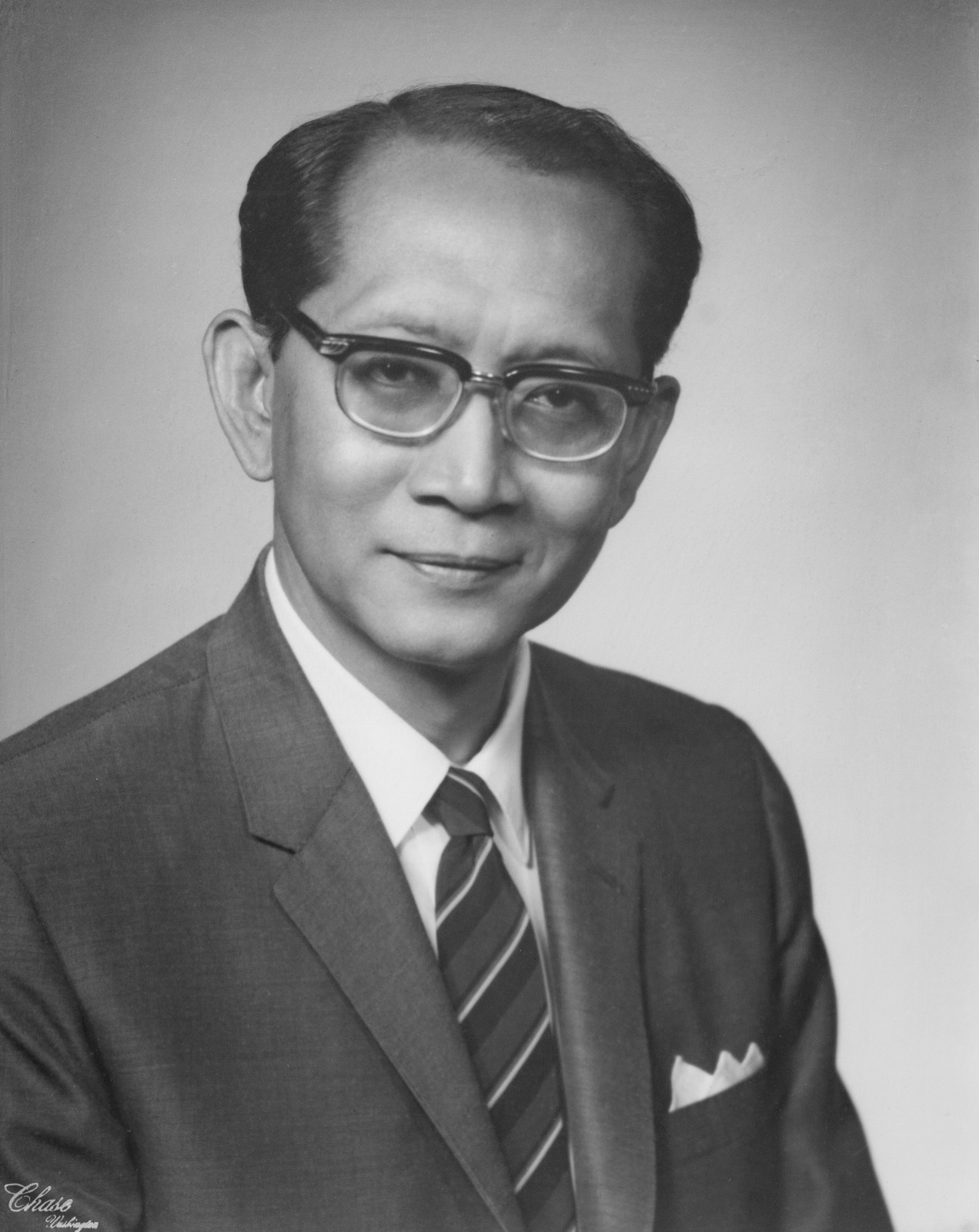
- Official portrait, 1968

Rector of United Nations University
- In office 10 April 1980 – 30 March 1987
- Preceded by: James M. Hester
- Succeeded by: Heitor Gurgulino de Souza

Ambassador of Indonesia to the United States
- In office 5 May 1968 – 31 July 1971
- Preceded by: Suwito Kusumowidagdo
- Succeeded by: Syarief Thayeb

Member of the Constitutional Assembly
- In office 12 December 1956 – 5 July 1959

Personal details
- Born: Soedjatmoko Mangoendiningrat; 10 January 1922 Sawahlunto, Sumatra's West Coast Residency, Dutch East Indies (present-day West Sumatra, Indonesia)
- Died: 21 December 1989 (aged 67) Yogyakarta, Special Region of Yogyakarta, Indonesia
- Party: Socialist (1955–1960)
- Spouse: Ratmini Gandasubrata (m. 1957)
- Children: 3
- Relatives: Nugroho Wisnumurti (brother); Sutan Sjahrir (brother-in-law)
- Education: Hogere Burgerschool
- Occupation: Academic; diplomat

Soedjatmoko (born Soedjatmoko Mangoendiningrat; 10 January 1922 – 21 December 1989), more colloquially referred to as Bung Koko, was an Indonesian intellectual, diplomat, and politician. He was born into a noble father and mother in Sawahlunto, West Sumatra. After finishing his primary education, he went to Batavia (modern-day Jakarta) to study medicine; in the city's slums, he saw much poverty, which became an academic interest later in life. After being expelled from medical school by the Japanese in 1943 for his political activities, Soedjatmoko moved to Surakarta and practiced medicine with his father. In 1947, after Indonesia proclaimed its independence, Soedjatmoko and two other youths were deployed to Lake Success, New York, to represent Indonesia at the United Nations (UN). They helped secure international recognition of the country's sovereignty.

After his work at the UN, Soedjatmoko attempted to study at Harvard's Littauer Center for Public Administration (now the John F. Kennedy School of Government); however, he was forced to resign due to pressure from other work, including serving as Indonesia's first chargé d'affaires in London for three months as well as establishing the political desk at the Embassy of Indonesia in Washington, D.C. By 1952 he had returned to Indonesia, where he became involved in the socialist press and joined the Socialist Party of Indonesia. He was elected as a member of the Constitutional Assembly of Indonesia in 1955, serving until 1959; he married Ratmini Gandasubrata in 1957. However, as President Sukarno's government became more authoritarian Soedjatmoko began to criticise the government. To avoid censorship, he spent two years as a guest lecturer at Cornell University in Ithaca, New York, and another three in self-imposed unemployment in Indonesia.

After Sukarno was replaced by Suharto, Soedjatmoko returned to public service. In 1966 he was sent as one of Indonesia's representatives at the UN, and in 1968 he became Indonesia's ambassador to the US; during this time he received several honorary doctoral degrees. He also advised foreign minister Adam Malik. After returning to Indonesia in 1971, Soedjatmoko held a position in several think tanks. After the Malari incident in January 1974, Soedjatmoko was held for interrogation for two and a half weeks and accused of masterminding the event. Although eventually released, he could not leave Indonesia for two and a half years. In 1978 Soedjatmoko received the Ramon Magsaysay Award for International Understanding, and in 1980 he was chosen as rector of the United Nations University in Tokyo. Two years after returning from Japan, Soedjatmoko died of cardiac arrest while teaching in Yogyakarta.

== Early life ==
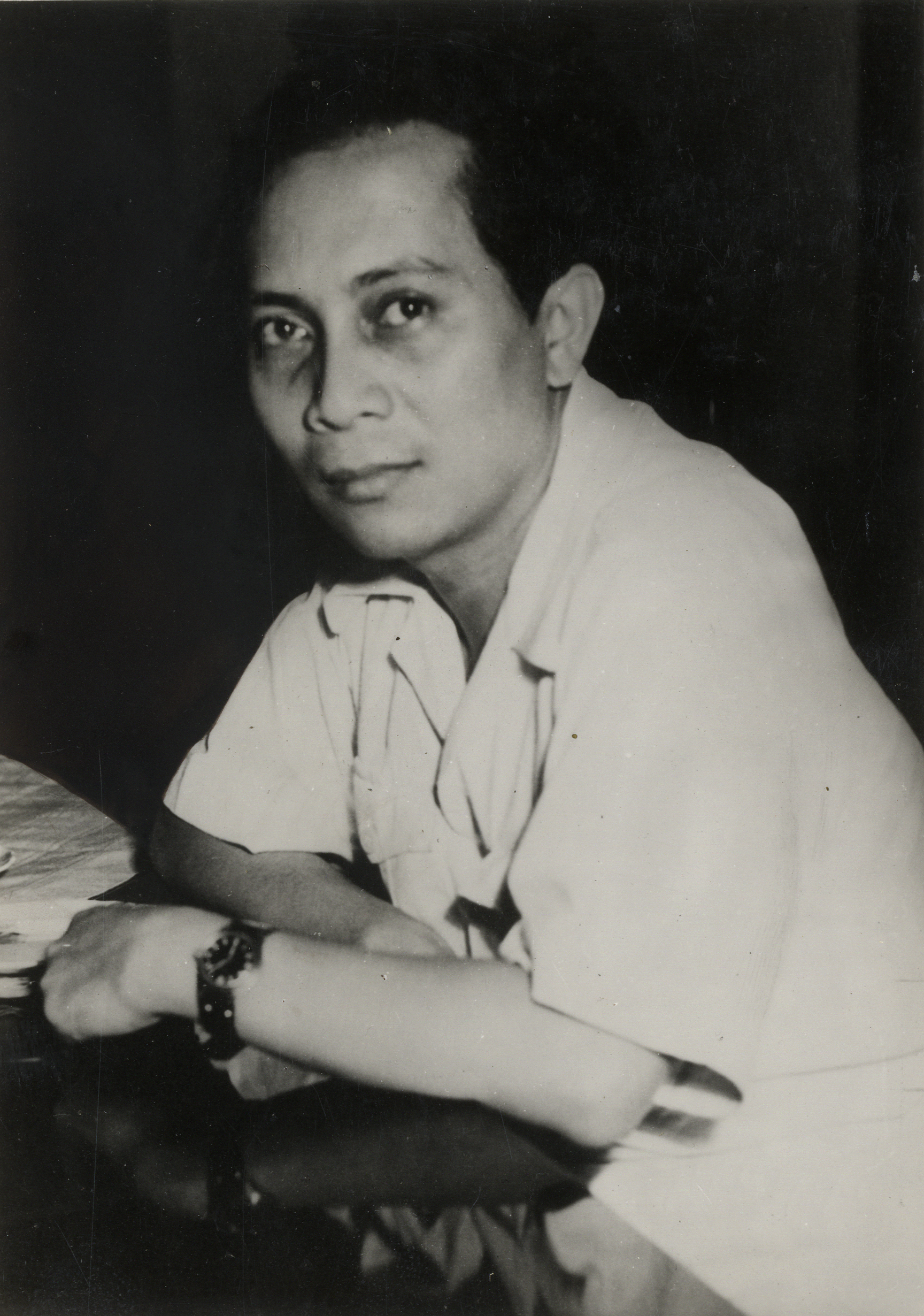
Soedjatmoko's brother-in-law, Sutan Sjahrir (pictured in 1946)

Soedjatmoko was born on 10 January 1922 in Sawahlunto, West Sumatra, with the name Soedjatmoko Mangoendiningrat. He was the eldest son of Saleh Mangoendiningrat, a Javanese physician of noble descent from Madiun, and Isnadikin, a Javanese housewife from Ponorogo; the couple had three other children, as well as two adopted children. Soedjatmoko's younger brother, Nugroho Wisnumurti, went on to work at the United Nations. His younger sister Miriam Budiardjo was the first woman to be an Indonesian diplomat and became a co-founder and Dean of the Faculty of Social Science at the University of Indonesia. When he was two years old, he and his family moved to the Netherlands after his father received a five-year scholarship. After returning to Indonesia, Soedjatmoko continued his studies at a Europeesche Lagere School (ELS) in Manado, North Sulawesi.

Soedjatmoko later attended a Hogere Burgerschool in Surabaya, where he graduated in 1940. The school introduced him to Latin and Greek, and one of his teachers introduced him to European art; he later recalled that this introduction had allowed him to see Europeans as more than colonists. He then continued to medical school in Batavia (modern-day Jakarta). Upon seeing the slums of Jakarta, he was drawn to the issue of poverty, a subject which would later become an academic interest of his. However, during the Japanese occupation of the Dutch East Indies, in 1943, he was expelled from the city due to his relationship with Sutan Sjahrir – who had married Soedjatmoko's sister Siti Wahyunah – and participation in protests against the occupation.

After his expulsion, Soedjatmoko moved to Surakarta and studied Western history and political literature, which led to him developing an interest in socialism. Some figures who affected him besides Karl Marx were Ortega y Gasset and Jan Romein. While in Surakarta he also worked at his father's hospital. After Indonesia proclaimed its independence, Soedjatmoko was asked to become Deputy Head of the Foreign Press Department in the Ministry of Information. In 1946, at the request of Prime Minister Sjahrir, he and two friends established a Dutch-language weekly, Het Inzicht (Inside), as a counter to the Dutch-sponsored Het Uίtzicht (Outlook). The next year, they launched a socialist-oriented journal, Siasat (Tactics), which was published weekly. During this period Soedjatmoko dropped the name Mangoendiningrat, as it reminded him of the feudal aspects of Indonesian culture.

== Career ==
=== Time abroad ===
In 1947, Sjahrir sent Soedjatmoko to New York as a member of the Indonesian Republic's "observer" delegation to the United Nations (UN). The delegation travelled to the United States via the Philippines after a two-month stay in Singapore; while in the Philippines, President Manuel Roxas guaranteed support of the nascent nation's case at the United Nations. Soedjatmoko stayed in Lake Success, New York, the temporary location of the UN, and participated in debates over international recognition of the new country. Towards the end of his stay in New York, Soedjatmoko enrolled at Harvard's Littauer Center; as, at the time, he was still part of the UN delegation, he commuted between New York and Boston for seven months. After being released from the delegation, he spent most of a year at the center; for three months, however, he was chargé d'affaires – the nation's first – at the Dutch East Indies desk of the Dutch embassy in London, serving in a temporary capacity while the Indonesian embassy was being established. In 1951, Soedjatmoko moved to Washington D.C. to establish the political desk at the Indonesian embassy there; he also became the Alternate Permanent Representative of Indonesia at the UN. This busy schedule, demanding a commute between three cities, proved to be too much for him and he dropped out of the Littauer Center. In late 1951, he resigned from his positions and went to Europe for nine months, seeking political inspiration. In Yugoslavia, he met Milovan Djilas, who impressed him greatly.

=== Return home ===
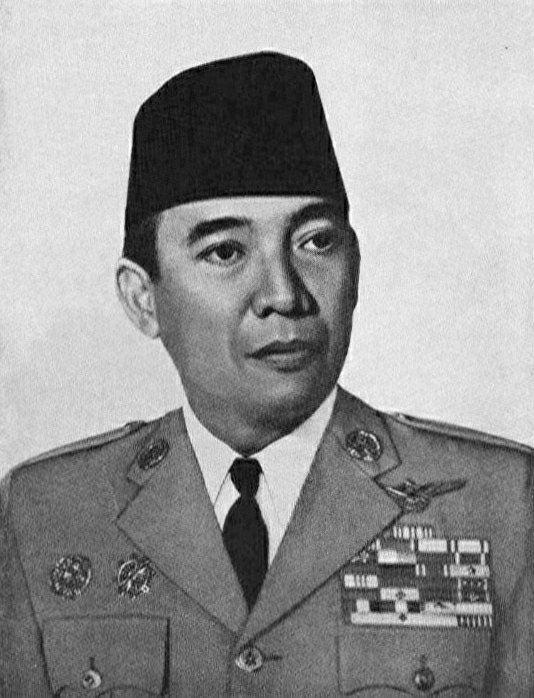
Indonesian President Sukarno, whose Guided Democracy policy Soedjatmoko opposed

Upon returning to Indonesia, Soedjatmoko once again became an editor of Siasat. In 1952, he was one of the founders of the Socialist Party daily Pedoman (Guidance); this was followed by a political journal, Konfrontasi (Confrontation). He also helped to establish the Pembangunan publishing house, which he directed until 1961. Soedjatmoko joined the Indonesian Socialist Party (Partai Sosialis Indonesia, or PSI) in 1955, and was elected as a member of the Constitutional Assembly of Indonesia in the 1955 elections until the dissolution of the assembly in 1959. He served with the Indonesian delegation at the Bandung Conference in 1955. Later the same year, he founded the Indonesian Institute of World Affairs and became its Secretary General for four years. Soedjatmoko married Ratmini Gandasubrata in 1957. Together they had three daughters.

Towards the end of the 1950s, Soedjatmoko and President Sukarno, with whom he had had a warm working relationship, had a falling out over the president's increasingly authoritarian policies. In 1960 Soedjatmoko co-founded and headed the Democratic League, which attempted to promote democracy in the country; he also opposed Sukarno's Guided Democracy policy. When the effort failed, Soedjatmoko went to the US and took a position as a guest lecturer at Cornell University. When he returned to Indonesia in 1962, he discovered that key members of the PSI had been arrested and the party banned; both Siasat and Pedoman were closed. To avoid trouble with the government, Soedjatmoko voluntarily left himself unemployed until 1965, when he became co-editor of An Introduction to Indonesian Historiography.

=== Ambassadorship ===
After the failed coup d'état in 1965 and the replacement of Sukarno by Suharto, Soedjatmoko returned to public service. He served as vice-chairman of the Indonesian delegation at the UN in 1966, becoming the delegation's adviser in 1967. Also in 1967, Soedjatmoko became adviser to foreign minister Adam Malik, as well as a member of the International Institute for Strategic Studies, a London-basedthink tank; the following year he became Indonesian ambassador to the United States, a position which he held until 1971. During his time as ambassador, Soedjatmoko received honorary doctorates from several American universities, including Cedar Crest College in 1969 and Yale in 1970. He also published another book, Southeast Asia Today and Tomorrow (1969). Soedjatmoko returned to Indonesia in 1971; upon his return, he became Special Adviser on Social and Cultural Affairs to the Chairman of the National Development Planning Agency. That same year, he became a board member of the London-based International Institute for Environment and Development, a position which he held until 1976; he also joined the Club of Rome.

In 1972 Soedjatmoko was selected to the board of trustees of the Ford Foundation, in which position he served 12 years; also in 1972 he became a governor of the Asian Institute of Management, a position which he held for two years. The following year he became a governor of the International Development Research Center. In 1974, based on falsified documents, he was accused of planning the Malari incident of January 1974, in which students protested and eventually rioted during a state visit by Prime Minister of Japan Kakuei Tanaka. Held for interrogation for two and a half weeks, Soedjatmoko was not allowed to leave Indonesia for two and a half years for his suspected involvement. In 1978 Soedjatmoko received the Ramon Magsaysay Award for International Understanding, often called Asia's Nobel Prize. The citation read, in part:

Encouraging both Asians and outsiders to look more carefully at the village folkways they would modernize, [Sodjatmoko] is fostering awareness of the human dimension essential to all development. [...] [H]is writings have added consequentially to the body of international thinking on what can be done to meet one of the greatest challenges of our time; how to make life more decent and satisfying for the poorest 40 percent in Southeastern and southern Asia.

In response, Soedjatmoko said he felt "humbled, because of [his] awareness that whatever small contribution [he] may have made is dwarfed by the magnitude of the problem of persistent poverty and human suffering in Asia, and by the realization of how much still remains to be done."

== Later life and death ==
In 1980 Soedjatmoko moved to Tokyo, Japan. In September of that year he began service as the rector of the United Nations University, replacing James M. Hester; he remained in that position until 1987. In Japan he published two further books, The Primacy of Freedom in Development and Development and Freedom. He received the Asia Society Award in 1985, and the Universities Field Staff International Award for Distinguished Service to the Advancement of International Understanding the following year. Soedjatmoko died of cardiac arrest on 21 December 1989 when he was lecturing at Muhammadiyah University of Yogyakarta.
