= Faculty of Law, University of Indonesia =

Coordinates: 6.3646°S 106.8317°E

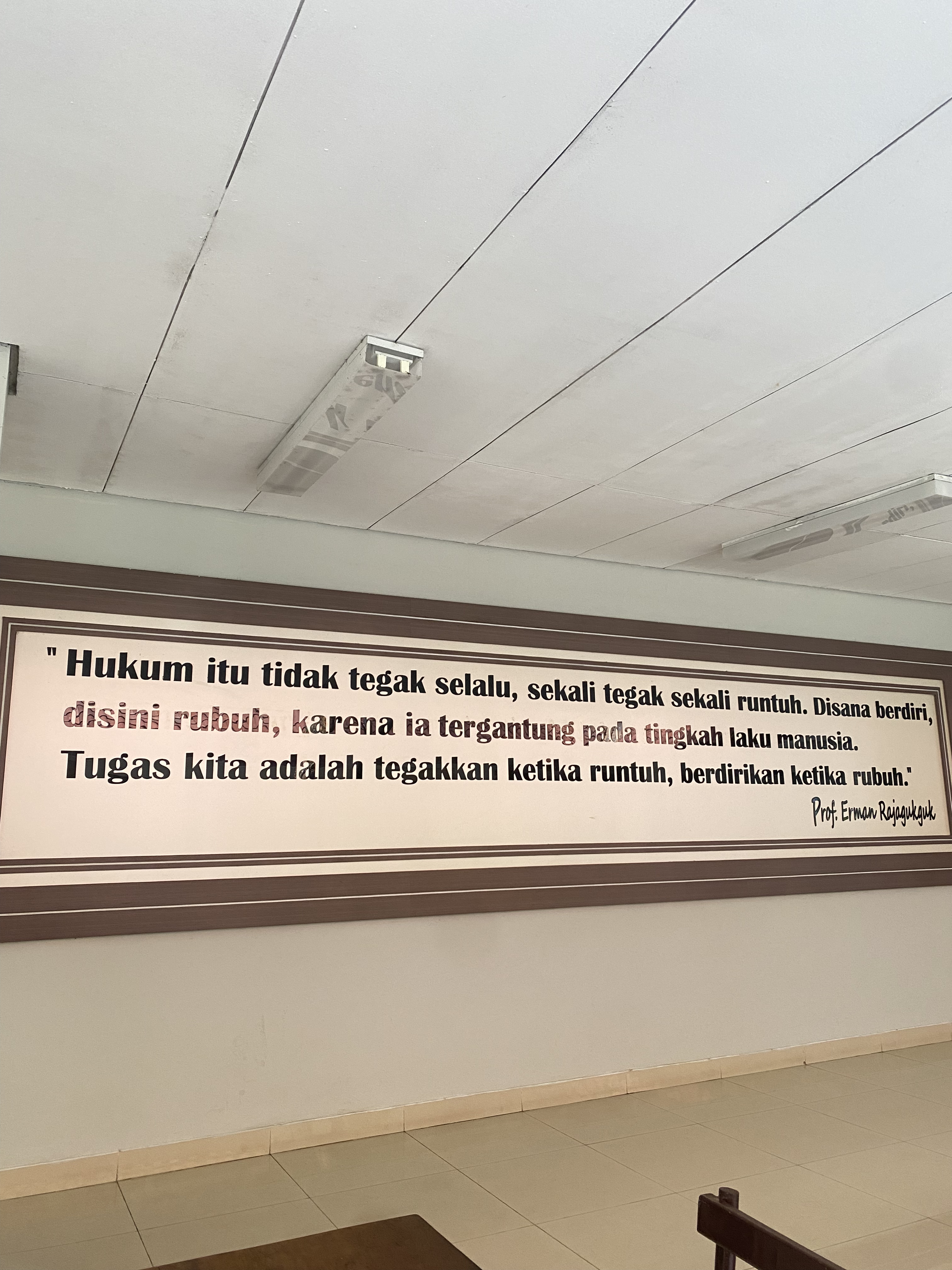
- The law school building in 2025
- Depok, West Java, Indonesia

Information
- School type: Public law school
- Established: 1909 – 18 May 1928 (as Rechtsschool); 28 October 1924; 102 years ago (as Rechtshogeschool); 21 June 1946; 80 years ago (as Nood Universiteit); 1950; 76 years ago (as Universiteit Indonesia)
- Dean: Parulian Paidi Aritonang
- Faculty: 1
- Enrollment: 485 (2022)
- Website: law.ui.ac.id

The Faculty of Law University of Indonesia (Indonesian: Fakultas Hukum Universitas Indonesia, abbreviated as FH UI) is the law school of the University of Indonesia, a public university in Depok, West Java. Founded in 1924, it is the oldest continuously operating law school in Indonesia.

== History ==
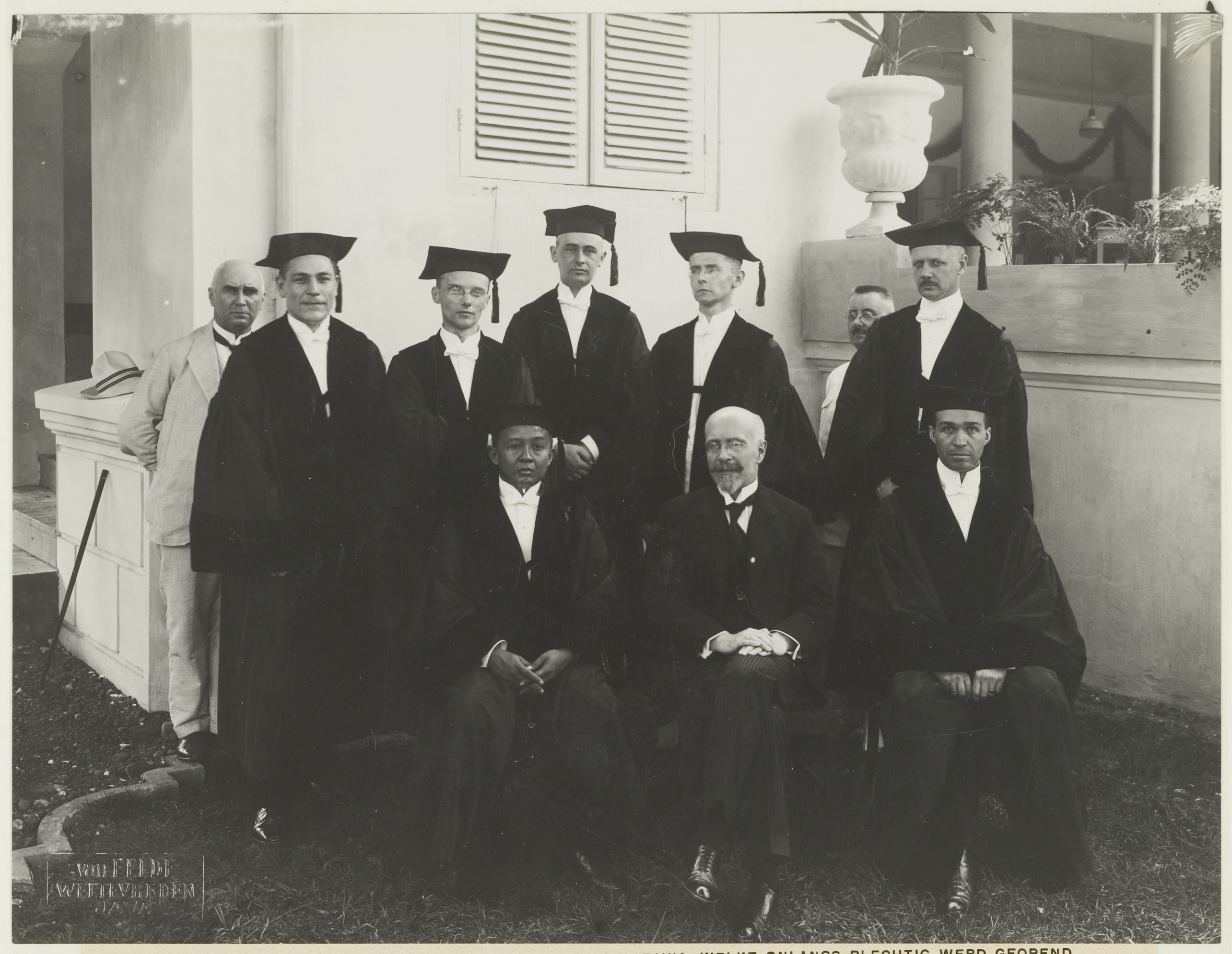
The professors on the opening of Rechtshoogeschool te Batavia in 1924

The Faculty of Law University of Indonesia was founded in Batavia in 1909 as the Rechtsschool (Law School), a college of law established as a realization of a request from the Regent of Serang, Achmad Djajadiningrat, for the purposes of training legal staff for the district court. The name Rechtsschool was later changed to Rechtshoogeschool te Batavia (Law School at Batavia, abbreviated as RHS) by Governor-General Dirk Fock on 28 October 1924, with a purpose to develop the lower civil administration personnel.

During the Japanese occupation of the Dutch East Indies, this law school was closed. It was reestablished in Jakarta by the NICA on 21 June 1946 as a temporary university with the name Nood Universiteit (Emergency University). In 1947, the name Rechtshoogeschool te Batavia was changed to the Universiteit van Indonesië te Djakarta (University of Indonesia at Jakarta).

After the Indonesian National Revolution ended with transfer of sovereignty over the Dutch East Indies to Indonesia in 1949, the Universiteit van Indonesië te Djokjakarta moved from Yogyakarta to Jakarta and the two merged as the Universiteit Indonesia in 1950.

== Reputation ==
FH UI was in the world top 100 in QS World University Rankings by law and legal studies subject in 2022.

== Notable alumni ==
Najwa Shihab, a journalist, was a graduate of FH UI in 2000. Scholars who graduated from FH UI include Maria Farida Indrati. Melki Sedek Huang, an activist and sex offender who formerly served as Chairman of Student Executive Board at the University of Indonesia, was a student of FH UI.

== Controversies ==
=== 2026 students sexual assault case ===
On 12 April 2026, a thread was posted by the account @sampahfhui on platform X regarding a sexual assault case involving several students from the Faculty of Law, University of Indonesia (FH UI). Several screenshots of conversations related to the case were also circulating, including statements demeaning women and implicating several individuals who are said to be part of the student organization structure at FH UI. In response to this, the Student Representative Body of the Faculty of Law, University of Indonesia (BPM FH UI) issued Decree (SK) Number 007/SK/BPMFHUI/IV/2026. In the decree, BPM FH UI stipulated the revocation of the active member status of the Student Family Association of the Faculty of Law UI (IKM FH UI) for a number of names listed in the decree. A number of institutions at FH UI, such as the Student Executive Board of the Faculty of Law UI (BEM FH UI), the Semi-Autonomous Body of the Faculty of Law UI (BSO FH UI) and the Family Body of the Faculty of Law UI (BK FH UI) also issued a statement condemning the alleged action. FH UI through its Instagram account @fakultashukumui, also issued a statement affirming the faculty's rejection of all forms of behavior that demean human dignity and contradict legal values and academic ethics. In addition, in the statement, FH UI also stated that it was conducting a thorough investigation and verification of the circulating information. "On 12 April 2026, the Faculty received a report regarding an alleged violation of the code of ethics that also potentially contains elements of a criminal act, related to the activities of some students," wrote the Dean of FH UI quoted from Instagram. From the report, the dean finally learned of screenshots of their students' conversations in a chat group. The conversation contained inappropriate content and indicated sexual violence. "The Faculty strongly condemns all forms of behavior that degrade human dignity and contradict legal values and academic ethics," stated FH UI. After receiving the report, the Dean of FH UI is conducting a thorough investigation and verification of this case. If violations are found, they promise to take firm action. "If violations are found, including those that have the potential to violate criminal law, the Faculty will take firm action in accordance with applicable provisions and coordinate with the authorities," they continued. According to a post from the Instagram account @blsfhui, the names of the perpetrators involved include Irfan Khalis, Nadhil Zahran, Priya Danuputranto Priambodo, Dipatya Saka Wisesa, Mohammad Deyca Putratama, Simon Patrick Pangaribuan, Keona Ezra Pangestu, Munif Taufik, Muhammad Ahsan Raikel Pharrel, Muhammad Kevin Ardiansyah, Reyhan Fayyaz Rizal, Muhammad Nasywan, Rafi Muhammad, Anargya Hay Fausta Gitaya, Rifat Bayuadji Susilo and Valenza Harisman.

The head of the BEM FH UI, Anandaku Dimas Rumi Chattaristo, confirmed the alleged sexual assault case involving 16 students. "An act of sexual violence has occurred involving FH UI students," Chattaristo said. He explained that initial information about the case surfaced after the alleged perpetrators sent an apology through a class group. From there, it was revealed that there had been a sexually suggestive conversation discussing another female student in their internal group. The conversation then circulated on social media. Chattaristo said that currently, the BEM FH UI is still being cautious in conveying the chronology to protect the victim. He could only explain that the student executive board has coordinated with the faculty to follow up on the report. "Hopefully, the perpetrators will be given the strictest possible sanctions by prioritizing the interests of the victim and creating a safe space," he said. The forms of harassment allegedly committed by the 16 students were verbal and digital. Chattaristo said there was no indication yet of the distribution of the victim's photo. However, he said he did not rule out the possibility of further findings as the investigation continues and emphasized the student executive body's firm stance on this case. "I am very disappointed with the sexual violence that occurred and will not tolerate actions that do not side with the victim," Chattaristo said. The Director of Public Relations, Media, Government and International Affairs at the University of Indonesia, Erwin Agustian Panigoro, said that the campus was aware of the alleged sexual harassment case. Panigoro said the campus has responded seriously to this case. He emphasized that the faculty and university strongly condemn all forms of behavior that demean human dignity. Panigoro said the tracing and verification process is ongoing. "Currently, the tracing and verification process is being carried out carefully and thoroughly by the Faculty and the University of Indonesia (UI) in coordination with the UI PPKS Task Force," he said. Panigoro added that the University of Indonesia (UI) guarantees protection, confidentiality, and assistance for those affected. "We ask all parties, including media partners, to respect the ongoing process," he said. If violations are proven during the investigation process, the university will impose sanctions in accordance with applicable regulations. "This includes academic sanctions up to and including dismissal from the student body," he stressed. "Further coordination with law enforcement authorities is also possible if criminal elements are found," Panigoro explained. UI ensures that the entire handling process is carried out professionally, independently, and free from intervention or conflicts of interest. The university also provides comprehensive assistance to affected parties, covering psychological, legal, and academic aspects and guarantees the confidentiality of the victim's identity. During the handling process, UI urges all parties not to disseminate unverified information. He emphasized that UI takes seriously reports of alleged verbal sexual harassment within the FH UI. Panigoro added that any form of sexual violence, including verbal violence that occurs in digital or offline interactions, is a serious violation of the university's core values, the code of ethics for the academic community and the provisions of applicable laws and regulations.

On 13 April, the Rector of the University of Indonesia, Heri Hermansyah, reiterated his commitment to combating every case of sexual harassment and violence that occurs on campus. "We will monitor it together. We will fight sexual violence," he said. Hermansyah said he had just learned of the information and was still awaiting a report from the faculty. "I just heard about it last night and I've asked the dean, and I'm waiting for a response," he added. Hermansyah said the rectorate was also following the developments of the case through circulating news reports. The rectorate, he continued, would monitor the handling of the case at the faculty level. "But I'm also paying attention to various media outlets. The Dean of FH UI has responded. So, we at the rectorate will monitor how it is handled at the faculty," he said. Hermansyah also emphasized that the campus would ensure the handling process runs according to procedure. UI, he continued, is committed to creating a safe campus environment free from sexual violence for the entire academic community. That evening, a live broadcast on TikTok, showing the ongoing internal hearing, quickly went viral and garnered public attention due to its tense atmosphere, filled with shouts from the crowd. In the live broadcast, which allegedly lasted for about 30 minutes, several students were seen gathered in a forum discussing a group chat case containing inappropriate conversations. The crowd appeared not only to follow the proceedings but also actively voiced demands for the perpetrators to be brought before the public. From the beginning of the broadcast, the atmosphere was tense. The crowd in the room was heard several times shouting demands for the perpetrators' identities to be revealed. This demand grew louder as the case progressed, especially as the case had sparked widespread outrage among students. Chants such as "show the perpetrators" echoed repeatedly, creating significant pressure on the hearing organizers. This situation demonstrated the high level of public emotion surrounding the sexual harassment case, which had previously gone viral on social media. The tension peaked when the two students suspected of being the perpetrators were finally brought before the crowd. Both were seen wearing white shirts and brown trousers, with their bodies bowed as they were shown to the hearing participants. When the two students appeared, the crowd's reaction was explosive. Shouts of condemnation and anger were heard from various directions, indicating deep disappointment with the alleged actions. Furthermore, some of the crowd continued to insist that other alleged perpetrators be brought into the meeting. This demand intensified the already tense situation. In addition to the two students present, two other individuals, believed to be members of the academic community, were also present. Their presence was believed to be to oversee the proceedings and ensure the situation remained under control. However, the situation quickly escalated to the point of chaos. During this time, a woman believed to be acting as a mediator attempted to calm the crowd. She appeared to be attempting to calm emotions and ensure the forum proceeded without further escalation. In a development report from the scene, it was stated that the previously summoned perpetrators had been questioned. Further proceedings were said to be carried out immediately in accordance with the applicable procedures. Meanwhile, other alleged perpetrators were reportedly asked to attend. However, their attendance was hampered by the lack of permission from their respective parents. This further triggered a backlash from the crowd, who continued to insist that all parties involved be brought into the meeting, and continued pressure from the students.
