= RSCM (disambiguation) =

RSCM may refer to:

- Royal School of Church Music, based in the UK, promotes music in Christian worship
- Dr. Cipto Mangunkusumo Hospital, Jakarta, Indonesia
- Religious of the Sacred Heart of Mary, a Roman Catholic community
