= Salemba =

Neighborhood in Jakarta

Coordinates: 6°11′34″S 106°51′1″E

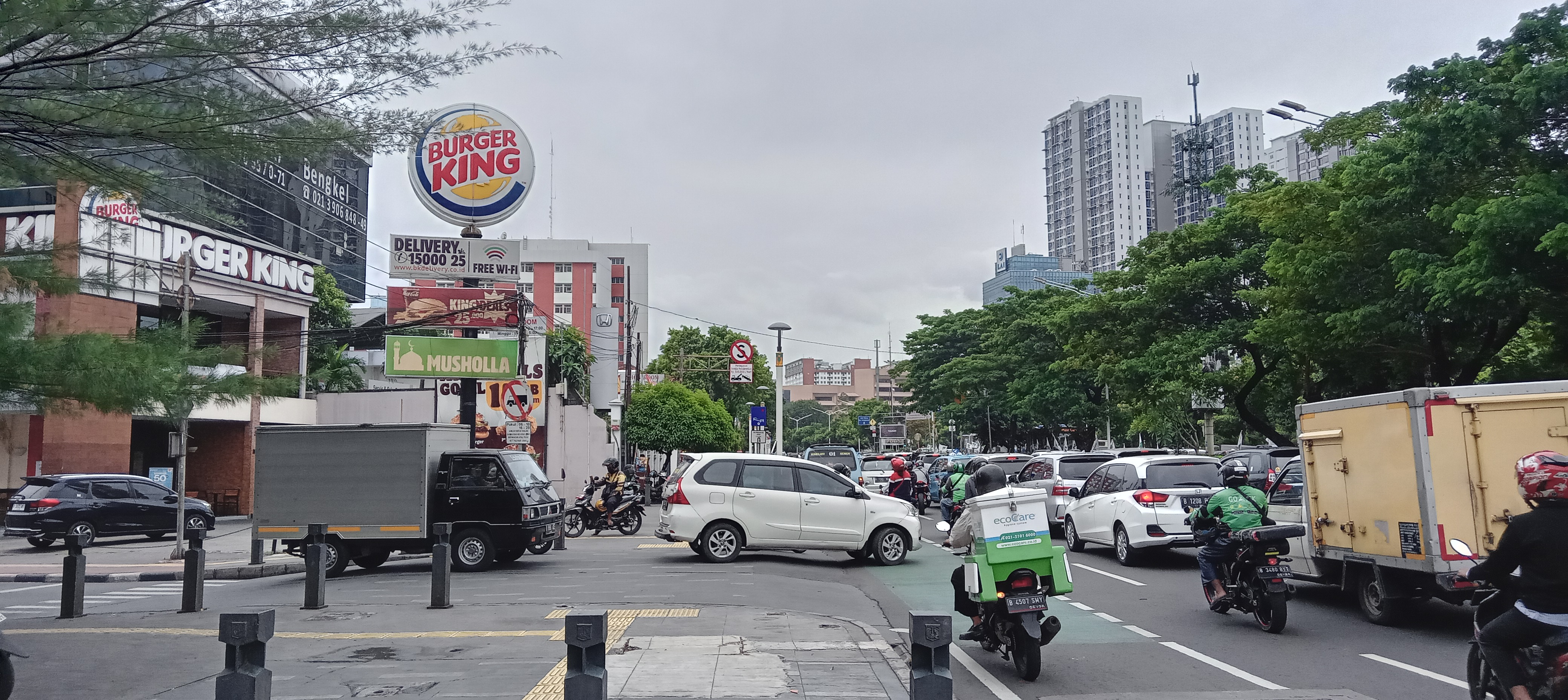
Street view of Salemba as of 2023.

Salemba is a neighborhood in the Senen district, Central Jakarta. Salemba referring to another name of Jeremias Latuihamalo, King Ullath, which was then appointed by Thomas Matulessy become king of Porto and accompany Thomas Matulessy (Kapitan Pattimura) as an advisor in the war against the Dutch. He finally caught at the end of the war, were interrogated on December 24, 1817, on February 2, 1818 was sentenced to hang by Ambonsche Raad van Justitie (Netherlands court in Ambon) but were given waivers by Buykes be sentenced to exile to the island of Java for 25 years. Yeremias Latuihamallo left for Batavia with warship "Wilhelmina" for serving a prison sentence.

Salemba name could also refer to the detention Penitentiary located here. This name is also famous for the University of Indonesia, located in the area.

== Notable buildings ==
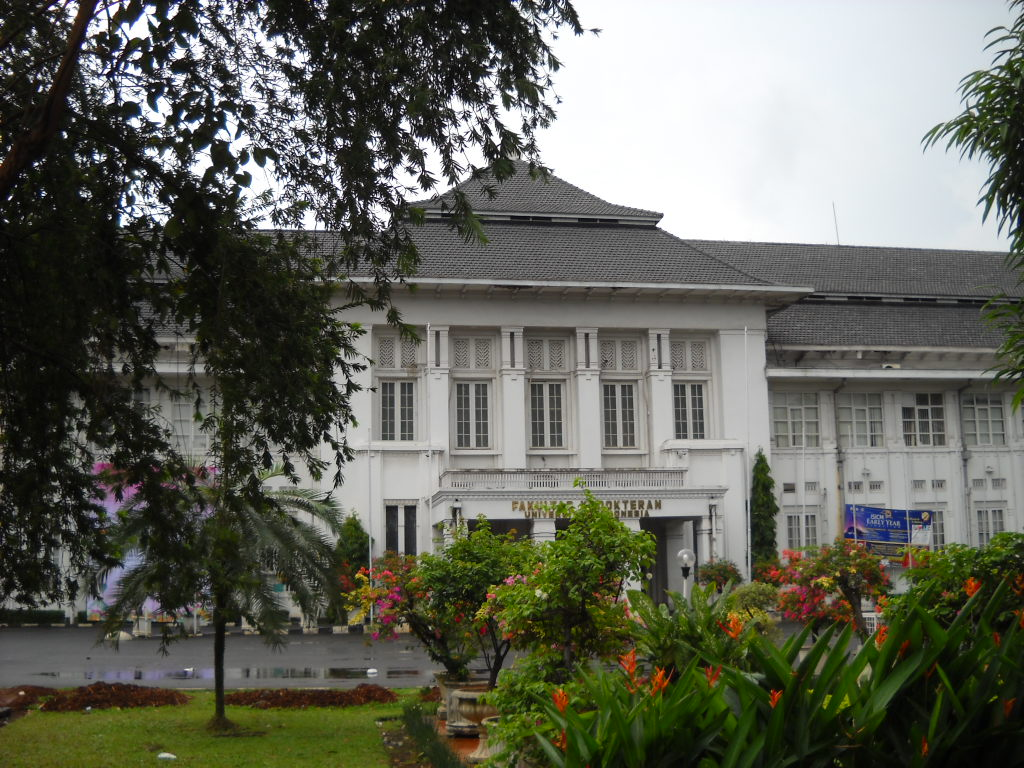
University of Indonesia Faculty of Medicine and Dentistry

The other buildings are well-known and located here are:

1. National Library of Indonesia
2. University of Indonesia (Faculty of Medicine & Dentistry)
3. Dr. Cipto Mangunkusumo Hospital (RSCM)
4. Saint Carolus Hospital
5. Communion of Churches in Indonesia
6. Indonesian Bible Society
7. Indonesian Christian University
8. Gunadarma University
