= Miriam Budiardjo =

Indonesian political scientist

- Born: 20 November 1923; Kediri
- Died: 8 January 2007 (aged 83); Jakarta
- Resting place: Gritama Cemetery
- Education: University of Indonesia; Georgetown University
- Awards: Bintang Jasa (id); Bintang Mahaputera Utama (id)
- Scientific career
- Fields: Political science
- Workplaces: University of Indonesia

Miriam Budiardjo (20 November 1923, Kediri – 8 January 2007, Jakarta) was an Indonesian political scientist and diplomat. Budiardjo was Deputy Chair of the Indonesian National Commission on Human Rights, and she has been credited with co-founding the Faculty of Social Sciences at the University of Indonesia, of which she was Dean for 5 years. She was the first woman to serve as a diplomat for Indonesia, which she represented in several countries including India and the United States.

== Life and career ==
Budiardjo was born on November 20, 1923, in the city of Kediri in East Java. Her older brother was Soedjatmoko, and her younger brother was Nugroho Wisnumurti. She also had a sister, Siti Wahyuni, who would later marry Sutan Sjahrir. Budiardjo studied at the University of Indonesia. In the 1940s, she was active with the group of young activists who would later coalesce into the Socialist Party of Indonesia, and her activism led her to serve as the Secretariat of the Indonesian Delegation to the Renville Agreement. She then became a diplomat, which made her the first woman to be a diplomat for Indonesia, serving in posts that included New Delhi and Washington D.C. throughout the late 1940s and early 1950s.

While in the United States Budiardjo obtained an MA in political science from Georgetown University, and she studied briefly at Harvard Universitybut left before completing a degree. She then earned a doctorate from the University of Indonesia, where she then joined the faculty. During her time at the University of Indonesia, she authored an introduction to political science. That textbook was widely used, with more than 20 printings. She also wrote a book on participation and political parties that was printed in 1998, and one in 1956 regarding the provisional parliament of Indonesia.

From 1974 to 1979, Budiardjo was the Dean of the Faculty of Social and Political Sciences at the University of Indonesia, an academic unit that she had co-founded together with a small group of other social scientists. Her predecessor in that position was Selo Soemardjan. Her students at the University of Indonesia included the political scientists Arbi Sanit and Juwono Sudarsono, and the sociologist Imam Prasodjo was her son-in-law. From 1993 to 1998, Budiardjo worked as Deputy Chair of the Indonesian National Commission on Human Rights.

In 1975, Budiardjo was awarded the Bintang Jasa Star of Service (id) for her service to the Republic of Indonesia during the struggle for independence. In 1998, she won the Bintang Mahaputera Utama (id), or the Great Mahaputera Star, which is the highest civilian award given by the Government of Indonesia, given to her for service on the General Election Commission.

Budiardjo died at Medistra Hospital in Jakarta, on 8 January 2007, due to respiration and kidney failure at the age of 83. She was buried on 9 January at Gritama Cemetery.

== Selected awards ==
- Bintang Jasa, Star of Service (id), Government of Indonesia (1975)
- Bintang Mahaputera Utama (id), Great Mahaputera Star, Government of Indonesia (1998)
