= INHERENT =

Indonesian inter-university educational network

The Indonesia Higher Education Network was an inter-university educational network in Indonesia. For the first phase of development, the network consists of 32 universities. The main ring of this network is located on the island of Java, with five universities as a backbone network connected using an STM-1 line with a total of 155 Mbit/s of bandwidth capacity. Those universities are the University of Indonesia, the Bandung Institute of Technology, the Sepuluh Nopember Institute of Technology, Gadjah Mada University and the Diponegoro University. It was active since 2006.

Since 2013, INHERENT is no longer active. The INHERENT Network was eventually replaced by the Indonesia Research and Education Network (IDREN) in 2015.
