= Dr. Cipto Mangunkusumo Hospital =

Dr. Cipto Mangunkusumo National Public Hospital
- Ministry of Health
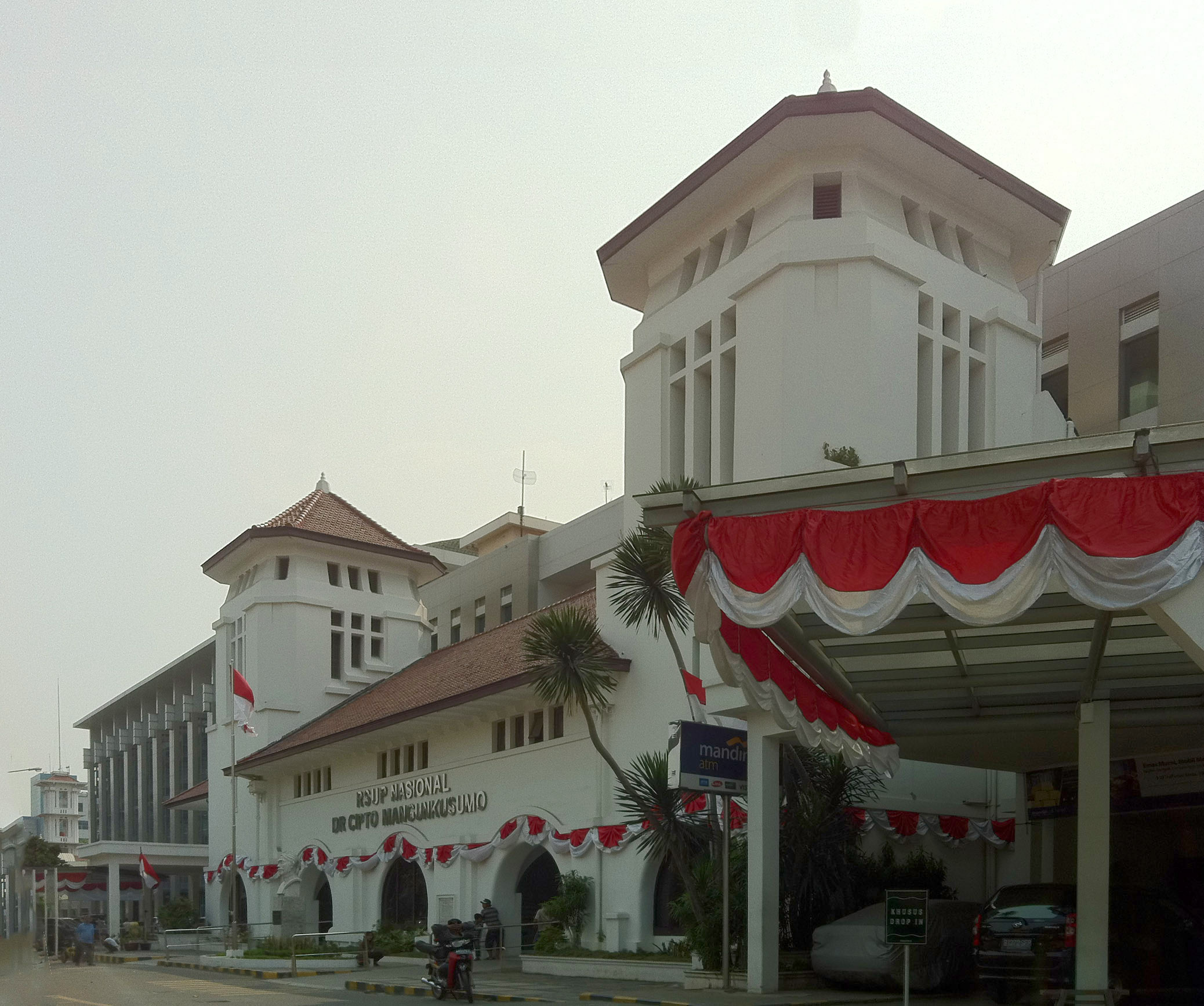
- Old building of RSCM

Geography
- Location: Jl. Diponegoro No.71, Salemba, Jakarta, Indonesia
- Coordinates: 6°10′51″S 106°50′46″E

Organisation
- Type: Teaching, District General
- Affiliated university: University of Indonesia

Services
- Standards: Tertiary level hospital/A Type Hospital – Indonesia
- Emergency department: Yes
- Beds: 1,001

History
- Founded: 19 November 1919

Links
- Website: http://rscm.co.id
- Lists: Hospitals in Indonesia

Dr. Cipto Mangunkusumo National Central Public Hospital (Indonesian: Rumah Sakit Umum Pusat Nasional Dr. Cipto Mangunkusumo, abbreviated as RSUPN Dr. Cipto Mangunkusumo or RSCM) is a government-run district general hospital located at Salemba in Jakarta, Indonesia. In 1964, it was named after Cipto Mangunkusumo, an Indonesian independence leader and Sukarno's political mentor. It is a general hospital that also serves as a teaching hospital for the University of Indonesia. RSCM provides primary, secondary, and tertiary care and acts as a national referral center for government hospitals. RSCM is generally regarded as the public hospital with the most comprehensive diagnostic and therapeutic services, offering some of the first and only medical and surgical services in Indonesia.

== History ==
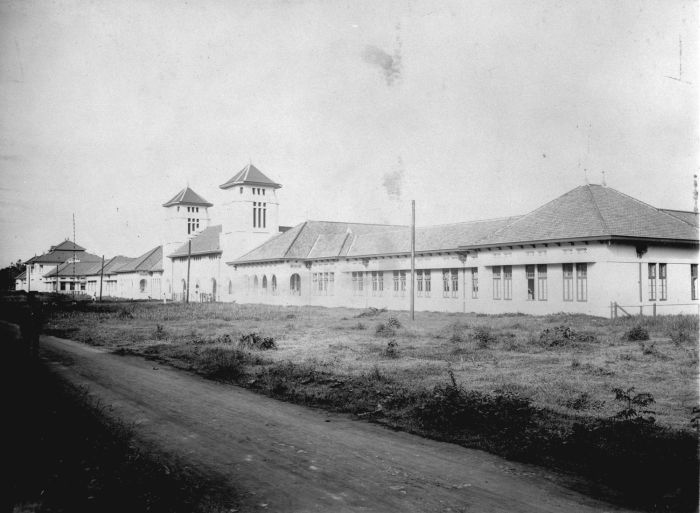
The Centrale Burgerlijke Ziekeninrichting (CBZ) hospital and Medical Laboratory

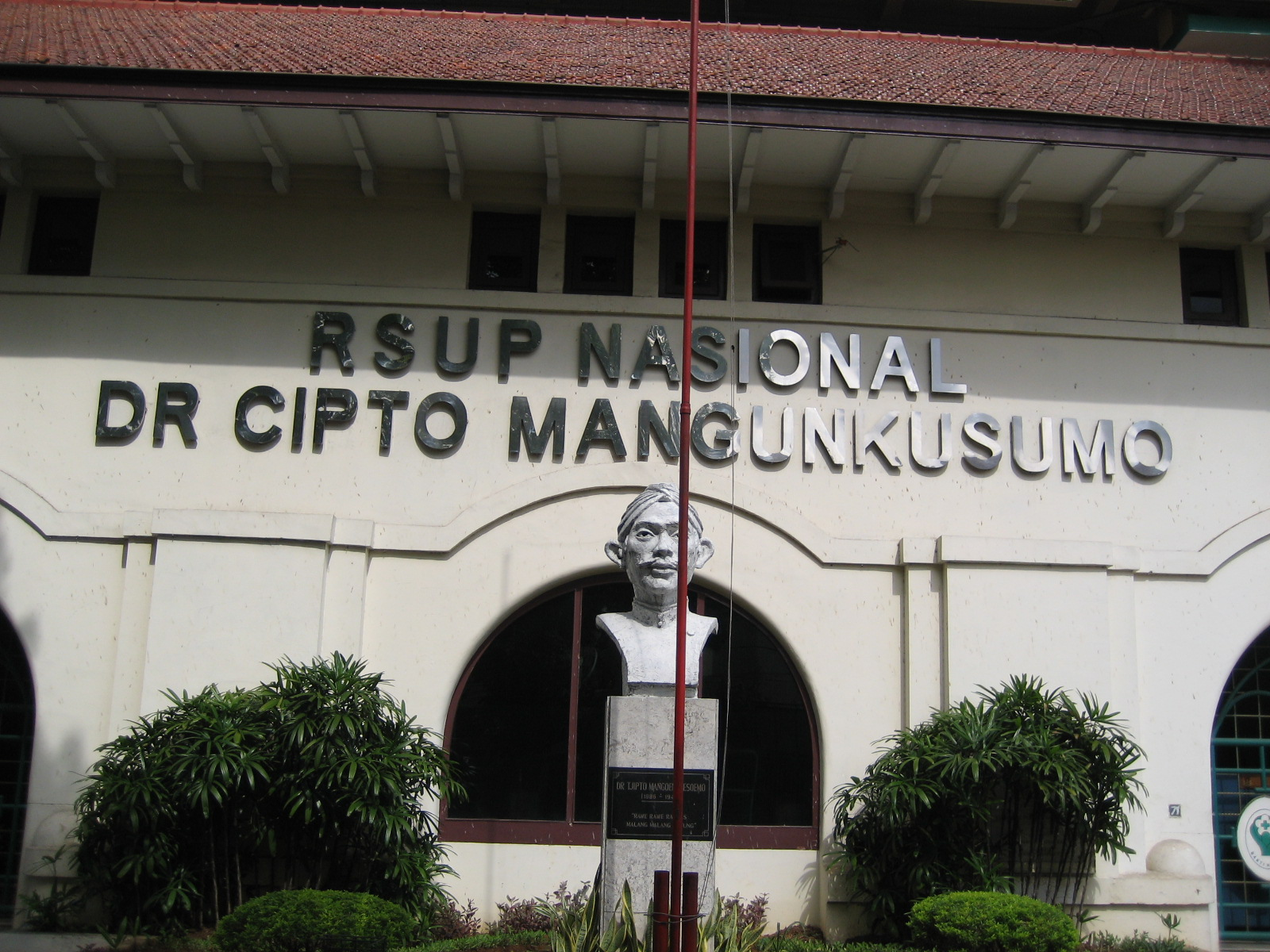
Cipto Mangunkusumo statue at the Cipto Mangunkusumo hospital in Jakarta

In 1851, the colonial Dutch East Indies governments established a medical assistant school that operated for two years. Graduates were certified to provide basic treatment. The degree conferred was Javanese Doctor, as the graduates were certified to practice only in the Dutch East Indies, especially Java. In 1864, it was expanded to three years. In 1875, the program had reached seven years, and the graduates were entitled to the degree of Medical Doctor.

The hospital was established on 19 November 1919 as the Central Civil Hospital (Dutch: Centrale Burgerlijke Ziekeninrichting, CBZ).

The hospital was used by the Imperial Japanese Army from 1942 to 1945. In 1945, the name changed to Rumah Sakit Oemoem Negri (RSON). In 1945, it was renamed again as Rumah Sakit Umum Pusat (RSUP). In 1964, after Indonesia's independence, the name changed to Rumah Sakit Tijpto Mangunkusumo (RSTM), now RSCM, to match the Indonesian language. In 1994, the hospital was renamed Rumah Sakit Umum Pusat Dr. Cipto Mangunkusumo (RSUP Dr. Cipto Mangunkusumo). In 2008, a new building was opened as the main hospital building with nearly 700 beds.

In 2010, the RSCM Kencana building with an integrated laboratory was inaugurated. In 2013, the Kirana RSCM building for eye care service opened. It is a 6-story building located at Jalan Kimia, Cikini, Central Jakarta. The Center for Maternal and Child Health (PKIA) was inaugurated in 2014 and is housed in a 12-story building.
