= Melki Sedek Huang =

Indonesian activist and politician (born 2000)

- Born: 15 October 2000 (age 26); Pontianak, West Kalimantan, Indonesia
- Education: University of Indonesia
- Occupations: Activist; politician
- Political party: Indonesian Democratic Party of Struggle

Melki Sedek Huang (born 15 October 2000) is an Indonesian activist and politician who was the chairman of the student executive council at University of Indonesia (UI) from 21 January 2023 until his dismissal on 18 December on the same year due to sexual assault. In 2024, Huang joined the Indonesian Democratic Party of Struggle (PDI-P) and currently serving as it Deputy Chairman in West Kalimantan.

== Life and career ==
Huang was born on 15 October 2000 in Pontianak, West Kalimantan, as the eldest child and only son of the two children of Erny Susanti and Rama Yuddi Huang (1964–2018). He had a younger sister, Nadya Calista Huang. Huang graduated from SMA Negeri 1 Pontianak in 2019 and studied law at the University of Indonesia. As a student activist, he was involved in organizations such as the Badan Eksekutif Mahasiswa Universitas Indonesia (BEM UI). Huang also did internship in several institutions, such as the Legal Aid Institute in Jakarta from August until November 2021, Tampubolon, Tjoe, and Partners Law Firm from August 2022 until February 2023.

In the law faculty's student executive council, he began his involvement as a staff and slowly rising to become the Deputy Head of Legal Research and Strategic Action Department. Huang moved to UI's student executive council in 2022, where he became the coordinator for social and political affairs. He ran for the chairman of UI's student council in November 2022 and was elected with a majority of votes in January 2023. Huang became the first chairman of the organization to come from a minority group in history.

In 2024, he joined Indonesian Democratic Party of Struggle (PDI-P) and preparing the West Kalimantan Red and White Cadets, the wing of the PDI-P. Huang added that he was interested in joining because he believes that PDI-P is committed to fighting for the constitution. He is currently serving as the Deputy Chairman of PDIP in West Kalimantan.

== Controversy ==
=== Puan Maharani rat meme ===
On 24 March 2023, UI's student executive council Twitter and Instagram account published a meme depicting the face of Speaker of the House of Representatives, Puan Maharani, in a rat body. In the video, the House of Representatives building is split open and a mouse appears from the rubble which was followed by the appearance of Puan in a rat body, with the narration likening the House of Representatives to the People's Robbers Council. This video was intended as a criticism for the House of Representatives, which enacted the Omnibus Law on Job Creation. Huang said that he often received attacks from buzzers after posting the meme.

Indonesian netizens had various diverging reactions to the video, some supported the meme while others said that the students instead should have demonstrated on the streets. University of Indonesia representative, Amelita Lusia, said that they respect the freedom to convey an aspirations in a civilized manner and added that the freedom of expression must also be addressed by careful analysis of issues and in accordance with etiquette, culture, law, and maintaining order, security, safety, and respect for all parties.

Hendrawan Supratikno, a politician for the Indonesian Democratic Party of Struggle, responded to the video said that criticism is part of the student struggle but there are also limitations that must be considered and added that don't let passion or persistent enthusiasm to defend a position slip into swearing that degrades the essence of the task, and goes outside the corridors and academic ethics. Many of politicians gave a various reaction such as United Development Party member, Arsul Sani, said that if the delivery was carried out by harassing the Puan like this it would not get any attention from the members of the House of Representatives in general and added that in general there will be only suspicions that students were being used by other parties. General Treasurer of NasDem Party, Ahmad Saroni, said that critics must be conveyed substantively and not in symbolic ways or even by attacking someone personally. Vice Chairman of Gerindra Party, Habiburokhman, said that policies and politicians may be criticized but the institution must still be maintained and respected. He also compared what the Student Executive Board did with the 98 activists and said that the 98 activists fought against government policies at that time in intellectual ways.

Faldo Maldini, Special Staff of the Minister of State Secretary and the former Chairman of The Student Executive Board, accused Huang funded by foreign parties for political interests in the campaign to reject the job copyright law.

=== 2023 UI's Tuition Fee riot ===
By mid-2023, University of Indonesia increased tuition fees to more than four times the usual amount. University of Indonesia claimed that government assistance was decreasing and they needed to improve the quality of education. This policy resulted in hundreds of University of Indonesia students being unable to afford tuition fees and at risk of dropping out.

This policy was met with strong protests from all University of Indonesia students. They organized social movements and demonstrations for days. On the last day of the demonstration, there were building damages and severe clashes between University of Indonesia students and campus security guards. These clashes resulted in Huang getting injured and being sanctioned by the Rector.

=== 2024 Presidential Candidate Debate ===
On 23 August 2023, Huang invited the three of 2024 Indonesian Presidential Candidate such as Anies Baswedan, Ganjar Pranowo, and Prabowo, to hold a debate at the University of Indonesia on 14 September 2023. He invited all of the students and allowed the public to attend the debate event. His invitation were responded by Baswedan, Habiburokhman who represented Prabowo, and Said Abdullah who represented Ganjar Pranowo.

=== Accusation of being threatened by the authorities ===
On 25 November 2023, Huang stated that his WhatsApp account has been hacked. He said that he was intimidated by the authorities on 28 October by visiting his school and home and asking about his personal information. Huang later added that he believed it was related to the increasingly heated atmosphere in the 2024 presidential election and affecting critical community groups like himself. West Kalimantan Regional Police Chief Inspector General Pipit Rismanto denied this and confirmed that none of his members were involved in the alleged intimidation. Mahfud MD responded and said that he will sent a team to carry out additional investigations regarding the alleged intimidation to Huang and added that if this turned out to be true, the police had violated the constitution. The alleged intimidation he experienced was then conveyed by Ganjar Pranowo who said that democracy is often advocated for respect, but law enforcement officers often behave in an intimidating manner which must be resolved immediately.

=== Sexual assault ===
On 18 December 2023, Huang was temporarily dismissed from his position as chairman of the University of Indonesia Student Executive Board because he was suspected of committing sexual assault. However, he didn't know about the rules that he broke and said that he never did a sexual assault, and will face legal proceedings if the report is true. University of Indonesia representative, Amelita Lusia, said that the matter was an internal matter of the Indonesian University Student Executive Board so public comments could not be given.

Huang's deputy, Shifa Anindya Hartono, responded and said that the student executive had received the report and was carrying out an investigation. Chair of the Task Force for Preventing and Handling Sexual Violence University of Indonesia, Manneke Budiman, said that they had received a report of alleged sexual violence committed by Huang. However, Huang's dismissal was carried out as a procedure until the case had finished investigated. On 29 January 2024, Huang was proven to be guilty for doing a sexual assault and received a suspension for one semester from Rector of the University of Indonesia, Ari Kuncoro. He was proved to have committed sexual violence in the form of touching, rubbing, groping, holding, hugging, kissing and rubbing parts of his body on the victim without consent, as well as practicing student community culture that had sexual violence in it. Huang then received a suspension for one semester and was banned from participating in organizations, activities, and was banned from being around the University of Indonesia. He is also required to attend psychological counseling regarding education regarding sexual violence which is carried out directly on campus.

On 31 January, Huang submitted a letter of objection to the decision and requested a reinvestigation of his case. He also accused that the decision was unfair due to the lack of transparency and irregularities.
