= University of Indonesia =

Public university in Jakarta and Depok

Coordinates: 06°21′55″S 106°49′37″E

- Universitas Indonesia
- Latin: Universitas Studiorum Indonesiensis
- Former names: School tot Opleiding van Inlandsche Artsen; (School for the Education of Native Physicians)
- Motto: Veritas, Probitas, Iustitia (Latin)
- Motto in English: Truth, Honesty, Justice
- Type: Public university
- Established: 1924 (as 'RHS/Rechts Hogeschool and GHS/Geneeskundige Hogeschool); 1947 (as Universiteit van Indonesië); 1950 (as Universiteit Indonesia)
- Affiliations: AUN, ASAIHL, APRU, ASEAN-European University Network (ASEA UNINET), FUIW, SEAMEO, Association of Universities of Asia and the Pacific (AUAP) Washington University in St. Louis McDonnell International Scholars Academy
- Rector: Prof. DR. Ir. Heri Hermansyah, S.T., M.ENG., IPU
- Faculty: 7,300
- Students: 47,357 students (AY 2010)
- Undergraduates: 33,516 (AY 2010)
- Postgraduates: 13,841 (AY 2010)
- Location: Jakarta and Depok, West Java, Indonesia
- Campus: Urban: Salemba Campus; Suburb: Depok Campus; Total 359 ha (888 acres)
Colors
University
Faculty
- Faculty of Medicine
  Faculty of Dentistry
  Faculty of Mathematics and Natural Sciences
  Faculty of Engineering
  Faculty of Computer Science
  Faculty of Law
  Faculty of Economics and Business
  Faculty of Humanities
  Faculty of Psychology
  Faculty of Administrative Sciences
  Faculty of Social and Political Sciences
  Faculty of Public Health
  Faculty of Nursing
  Faculty of Pharmacy
  School of Environmental Science
  School of Strategic and Global Studies
  Vocational Program
- Website: www.ui.ac.id

The University of Indonesia (Indonesian: Universitas Indonesia, abbreviated as UI) is an Indonesian public university located in Jakarta and Depok, West Java. It is one of the oldest tertiary-level educational institutions in Indonesia (known as the Dutch East Indies when UI was established), and is generally considered one of the most prestigious universities in Indonesia, along with the Gadjah Mada University and Bandung Institute of Technology. In the 2024 QS World Universities Ranking, UI is ranked 1st in Indonesia, 49th in Asia and 237th in the world.

== History ==
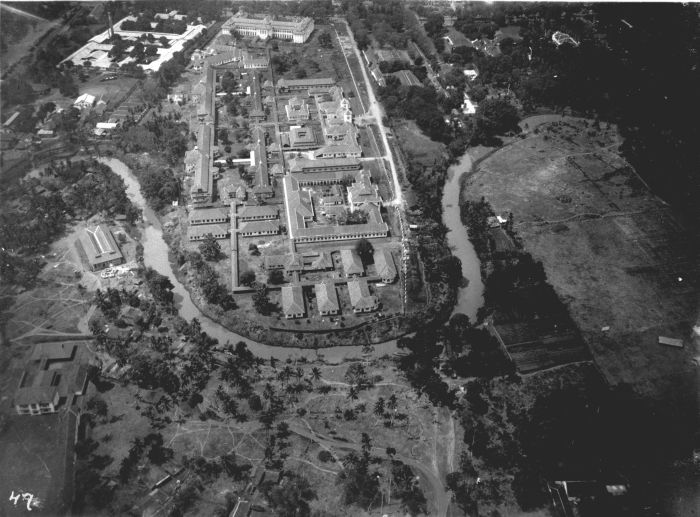
STOVIA medical school complex during the 1920s, the complex consists of buildings now known as the Faculty of Medicine of Universitas Indonesia (top) and Cipto Mangunkusumo Hospital (center).

UI's origins date back to the School of Health Sciences and Vaccines (Opleiding van eleves voor de genees-en helkunde en vaccine) on 2 January 1849 based on a decree from the Governor of the Dutch East Indies. At that time, the colonial government of the Dutch East Indies established a school to train medical assistants. Training lasted for two years, and the graduates were certified to perform basic medicine. Those graduates were awarded the title Javanese Doctor (Dokter Jawa) and were authorised to practice only within the Dutch East Indies, especially Java. The program became more comprehensive; in 1864 it was expanded to three years, and by 1875 it had reached seven years and the graduates were entitled to the degree of Medical Doctor.

The next step came in 1898, when the Dutch East Indies government established a new school to train medical doctors, named STOVIA (School tot Opleiding van Inlandsche Artsen). A school building was opened in March 1902, in a building that is now the Museum of National Awakening. The prerequisite to enter STOVIA was roughly the equivalent of a junior high school diploma. The schooling took nine years, so it was a mix between high school and university education. Education at STOVIA lasted for 9 years: 3 years at junior high school level, three years at high school level, and three years at diploma level. Many STOVIA graduates later played important roles in Indonesia's national movement toward independence, as well in developing medical education in Indonesia.

In 1924, the colonial government decided to open a new tertiary-level educational facility, the RHS (Rechts Hogeschool), to train civilian officers and servants. The RHS would later evolve into the Faculty of Law. In 1927, STOVIA's status was changed to that of a full tertiary-level institution and its name was changed to GHS (Geneeskundige Hogeschool). The GHS occupied the same main building and used the same teaching hospital as the current Faculty of Medicine. Many GHS alumni would later play roles in establishing the University of Indonesia.

After Indonesia gained independence, the Indonesian Institute for Higher Education (BPTRI) was established on 19 August 1945 in Jakarta. BPTRI had two faculties (then called colleges), namely the College of Medicine and the College of Law/Letters. The chairman of BPTRI was Prof dr Sarwono Prawirohardjo. The College of Medicine was officially opened on 1 October 1945. The institute produced its first 90 graduate students as medical doctors in the same year. When the Dutch colonial army occupied Jakarta in late 1945, the BPTRI moved to Klaten, Surakarta, Yogyakarta, Surabaya and Malang. On 21 June 1946, the Netherlands Indies Civil Administration (NICA) established the Nood Universiteit or Emergency University at Jakarta. In 1947, the name was changed to Universiteit van Indonesië (UvI) or Universitas Indonesia. Following the Indonesian National Revolution, the government established a state university in Jakarta in February 1950. The name was Universiteit Indonesia, comprising the BPTRI units and the former UvI, which was later changed into Universiteit Indonesia (UI).

Universiteit Indonesia officially started its activities on 2 February 1950 with its first president (now renamed to rector) Ir. R.M. Pandji Soerachman Tjokroadisoerio. The office of the President of Universiteit Indonesia was initially based in Jakarta, precisely in the Faculty of Medicine building on Jl. Salemba Raya no. 6, then moved to one of the former madat factory buildings on Jl. Salemba Raya no. 4, Jakarta. 2 February 1950 was later made the birthday of Universitas Indonesia. Initially, UI was a multi-campus university, with faculties in Jakarta (Medicine, Law, and Letters), Bogor (Agronomy and Veterinary Medicine), Bandung (Engineering, Mathematics and Natural Sciences), Surabaya (Medicine and Dentistry), and Makassar (Economics and Law). The Surabaya campus became the University of Airlangga in 1954. In the following year, the Makassar campus became the University of Hasanuddin.

In 1955, Law No. 10 on the change of the words universiteit, universitet, and universitit was passed, so since then, Universiteit Indonesia was officially renamed Universitas Indonesia.

In 1959, the Bandung campus became the Bandung Institute of Technology. The School for Physical Education, which was also in Bandung, became part of Padjadjaran University in 1960. In 1964, the Bogor campus became the Bogor Agricultural Institute and the Faculty of Teaching and Education in Jakarta became the Institute of Teaching and Education (now the State University of Jakarta). By 1965, UI consisted of three campuses, all in Jakarta: Salemba (Medicine, Dentistry, Economics, Engineering, Science and the Graduate School), Rawamangun (Letters, Law, Social Science and Psychology) and Pegangsaan (Public Health and parts of Medicine). In 1987, several faculties from the Salemba and Rawamangun campuses moved to a newly built campus in the outskirts of Jakarta. The campus in southern Jakarta is known as the Depok campus (it is in the city of Depok).

In the year 2007–2008, Universitas Indonesia underwent substantial reform. Revenue was significantly increased from 800 billion to 1.6 trillion rupiah. The number of research publications has increased. This is also the case with the university's endowment fund.

According to the 2008 survey of Globe Asia, UI ranked number first among the top universities in Indonesia. This report has been supported by a leading Indonesian magazine Tempo, which carried out a survey and analysis to rank universities and education in Indonesia. Universitas Indonesia has improved its research collaboration with international partners.

In August 2008, the university won the Indonesia ICT award for the smart campus with best content and application. In terms of accessibility and connectivity, Universitas Indonesia has won an award because 90% of the university's area is covered by IT infrastructure and services with its 305 Mbit/s. connection to the Internet, and its 155 Mbit/s. connection to the Indonesia Higher Education Research Network (Inherent).

== Logo and philosophy ==
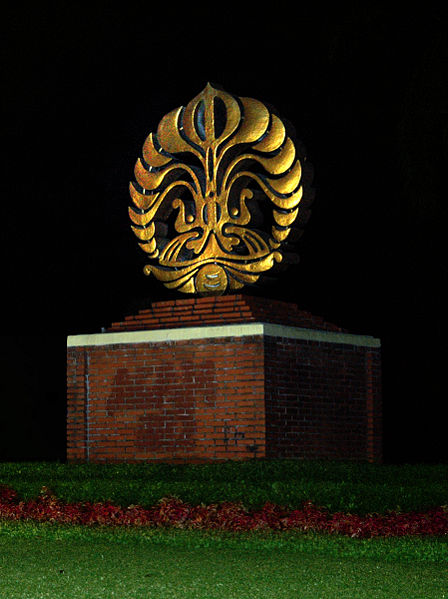
Monument (sometimes it is called Tugu Makara) at UI Depok Campus, located at the campus main road in front of Faculty of Psychology and Faculty of Law.

The earliest form of the logo of Universitas Indonesia was created in 1952 by Sumaxtono (a.k.a. Sumartono), a student from the 1951 Art Department class, Faculty of Engineering, at the time known as the Fakulteit Teknik Universiteit Indonesia, in Bandung.

The logo is the kala-makara, a symbol of the two sources of energy in nature. Kala is the energy from above (the power of the sun), while makara represents the energy from below (the power of the Earth). The two powers are combined and stylized into a symbol that represents the function of Universitas Indonesia as a source of knowledge.

The logo of Universitas Indonesia carries the following interpretation:

- The tree, which includes the buds and the branches, represents science and its branches, implying that the buds will soon flourish and turn into new branches of science. The buds will continue to blossom as long as the main tree is alive. By this, Sumaxtono intended to state that the branches of science will continuously grow.
- Water pouring down from the makara signifies the works of science.

The logo design and the meaning it carried were presented to Srihadi (a student from the 1952 class from the same department) in 1952. Prof. KRHT H. Srihadi Soedarsono Adhikoesoemo, M.A. who created the logo of Bandung Institute of Technology, was not sure who authenticated this logo or when. He was sure, however, that it was printed on the cover of the book Universiteit Indonesia, Fakulteit Teknik, Bandung: Rentjana Untuk Tahun Peladjaran 1952-1953 (Universitas Indonesia, Faculty of Engineering, Bandung: Course Plans for Academic Years 1952–1953), published by AID, Bandung, 120 pages, using the original design by Sumaxtono (without the pentagonal border). Each department / faculty has its own color scheme for the logo, for example: red for the Faculty of Law, blue for the Faculty of Engineering, blue-red for the Faculty of Computer Science, and sky blue for the Faculty of Psychology.

== Campuses ==
=== Salemba Campus ===
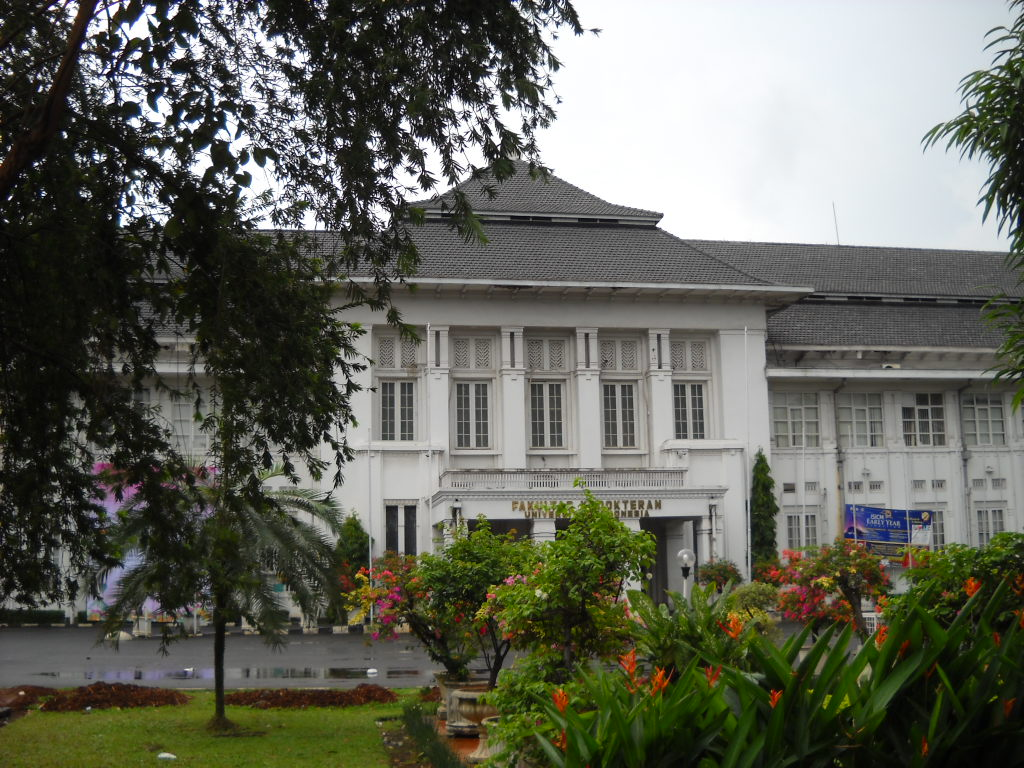
Faculty of Medicine at Salemba campus

The Salemba campus, located in Central Jakarta, is dedicated mostly to the faculties of Medicine and Dentistry. It adjoins with Cipto Mangunkusumo National Hospital (RSCM) as well as the University Dental Hospital. It houses parts of the postgraduate program, the Faculty of Law (Master of Law Science and Law Science Doctoral Program), Faculty of Economics (Extension and Master of Management programs), the School of Environmental Science (Master of Environmental Science and Environmental Science Doctoral Program), and the Faculty of Engineering (laboratories).

=== Depok Campus ===
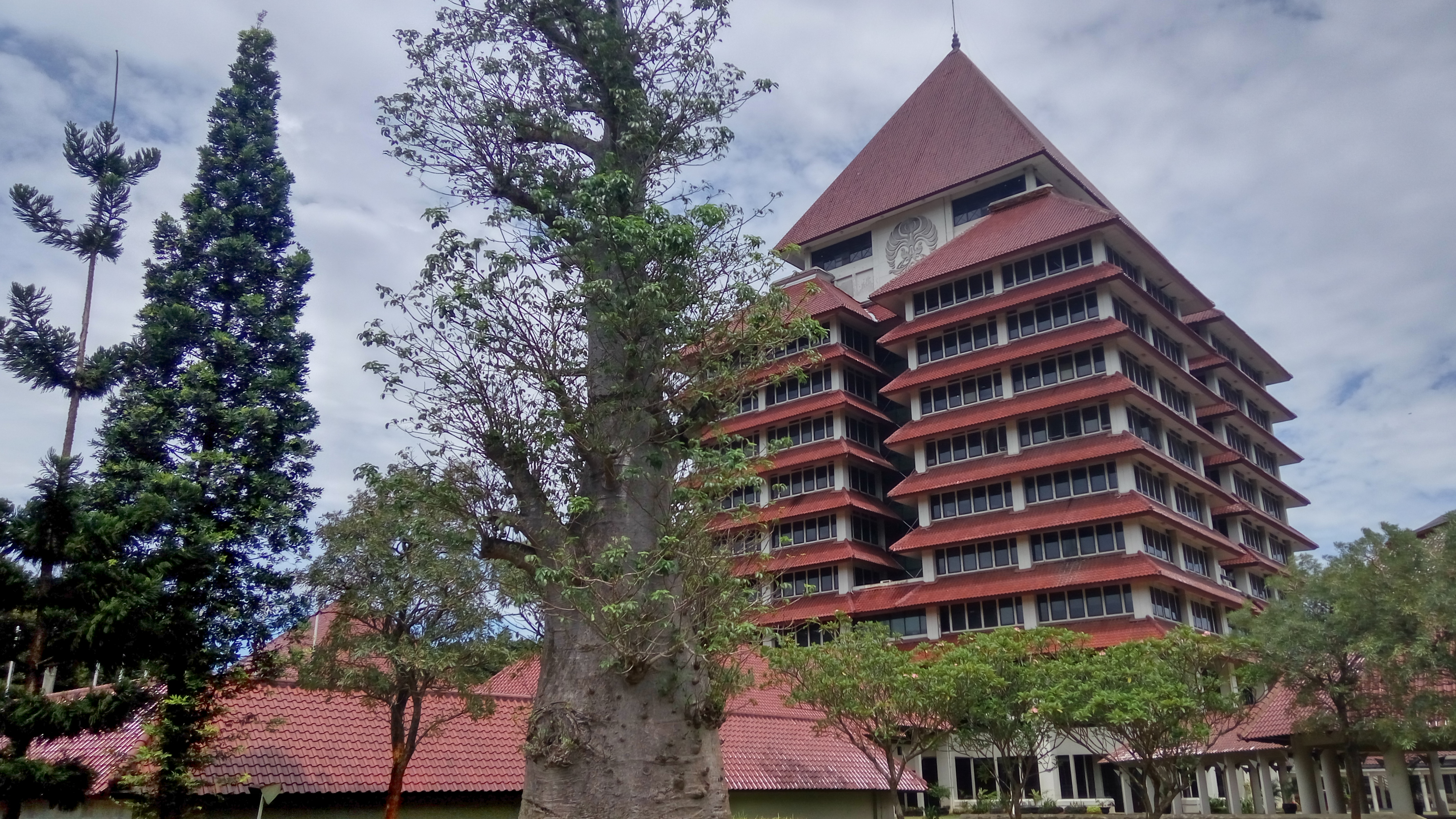
The rectorate building

The Depok campus, in Depok, just south of Jakarta, was built during the mid-1980s to accommodate the modernization of the university. It is now the main campus. Most of the faculties (Mathematics and Natural Sciences, Humanities, Pharmacy, Engineering, Psychology, Humanities, Economics, Social Politics, Law, Computing, Nursing and Public Health) have been relocated here.

The Depok campus is alongside the Jakarta-Bogor commuter railway, offering students easy access to transport by rail. Students also benefit from the frequent commuter bus services connecting many parts of Jakarta to Depok.

Undergraduate teaching of the medical and dental faculties relocated to Depok in 2010.

UI has a main library with a building area of 30,000 m^{2} and consists of eight floors with the slogan "Crystal of Knowledge". The groundbreaking ceremony was held on Monday, 1 June 2009 and the construction is targeted to be completed by December 2009. The UI library was designed with the concept of "sustainable building" where energy needs use renewable sources, namely solar energy, and no plastic is used. The new area is smoke-free, green and saves electricity, water and paper. The UI central library will be able to accommodate around 10,000 visitors at the same time or around 20,000 people per day and will also accommodate 3-5 million book titles. The library is also open to the public. The library is also equipped with public facilities such as souvenir shops, dining venues, places of worship, and student support facilities such as photocopying and post offices. Along with the main library, other facilities such as the Student Services Center, Student Activities Center, gymnasium, stadium, hockey field, hotel (Wisma Makara), travel agent and the dormitory are also provided within campus grounds.

Depok campus is home to six lakes which are located across the campus. The lakes are Kenanga Lake, Agathis Lake, Mahoni Lake, Puspa Lake, Ulin Lake, Salam Lake (the initials for which spell "kampus", the Indonesian word for campus).

=== Sustainability ===
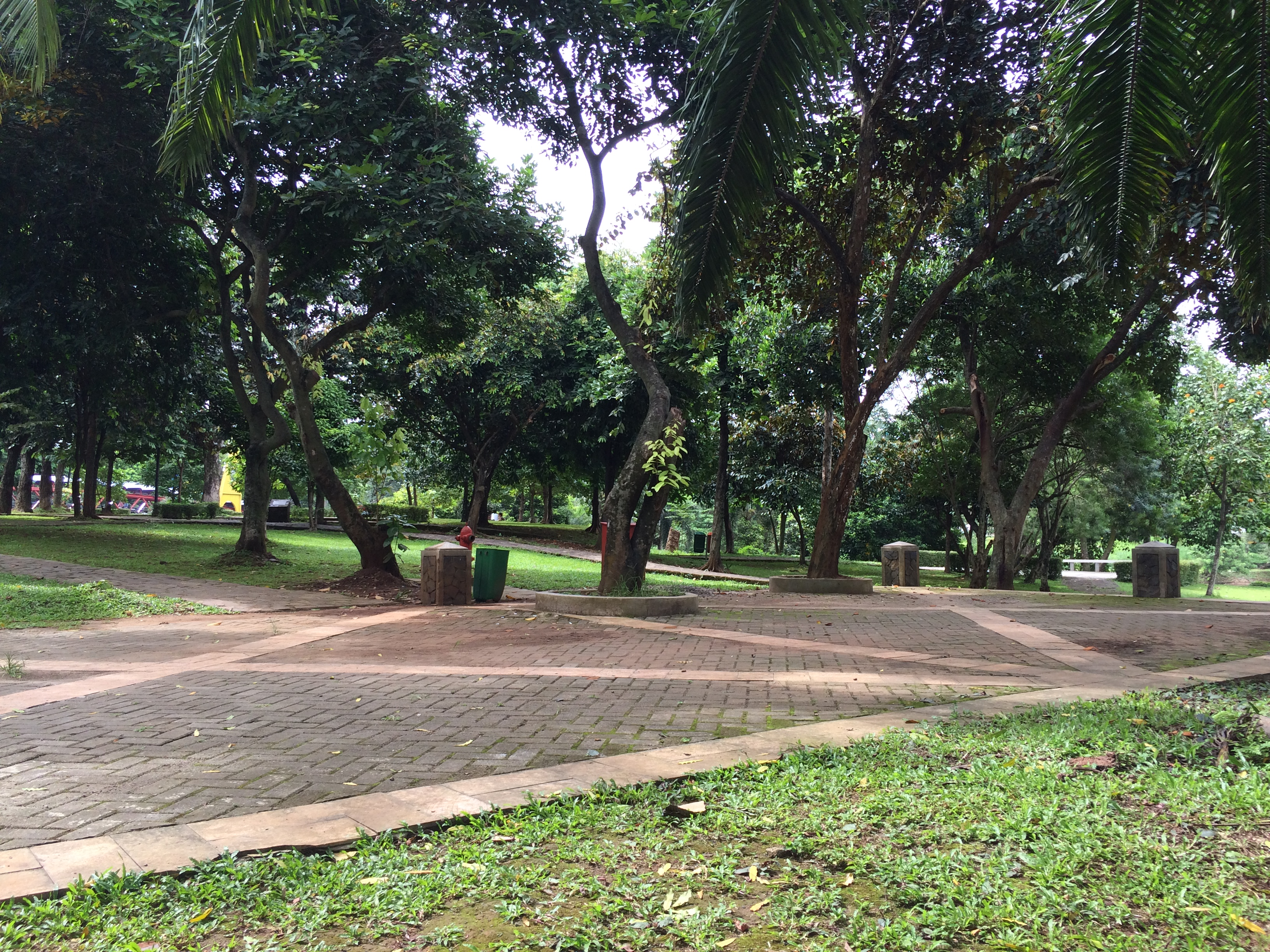
Most of the Depok campus is covered with forests.

Universitas Indonesia maintains 75% of its area for reforestation. Over 20 kilometers of bicycle path have been created and shuttle buses are provided for the students and faculty. The bicycles and buses are to decrease the number of vehicles in the campus. The new library "crystal of knowledge" at Depok used a sustainable concept. Not only in green area and transportation, Universitas Indonesia has relocated nine massive African baobab trees aging over 100 years (one said to be 240 years old) to the Depok campus to prove the university commitment in going green.

UI established the GreenMetric Ranking of World Universities in 2010 to provide detailed profiles of participating universities to promote sustainable operations. UI's GreenMetric World University Ranking shows the extent to which a university is reducing carbon emissions through efficient energy use, alternative forms of transport, greening the campus and recycling.

== Facilities ==
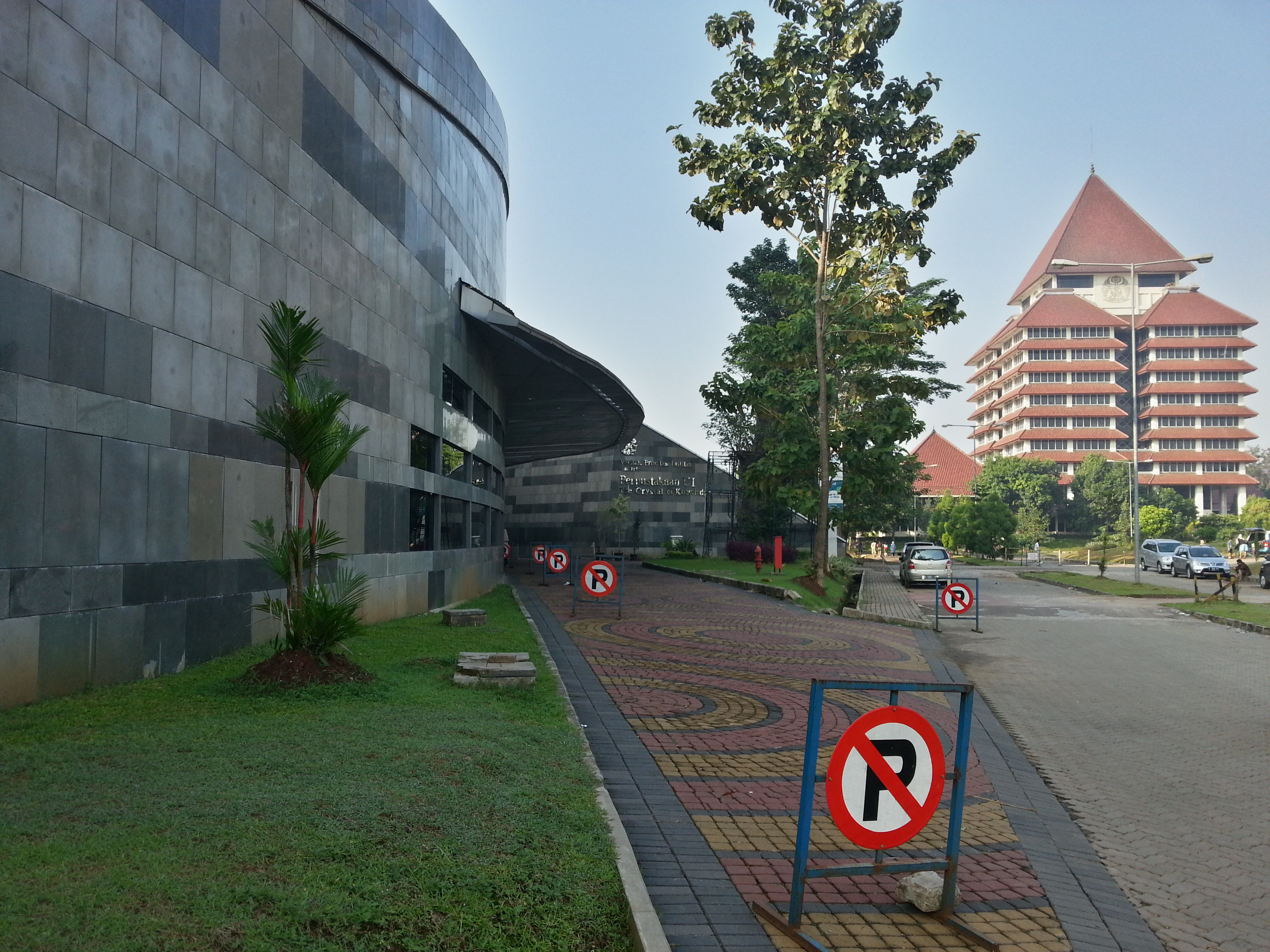
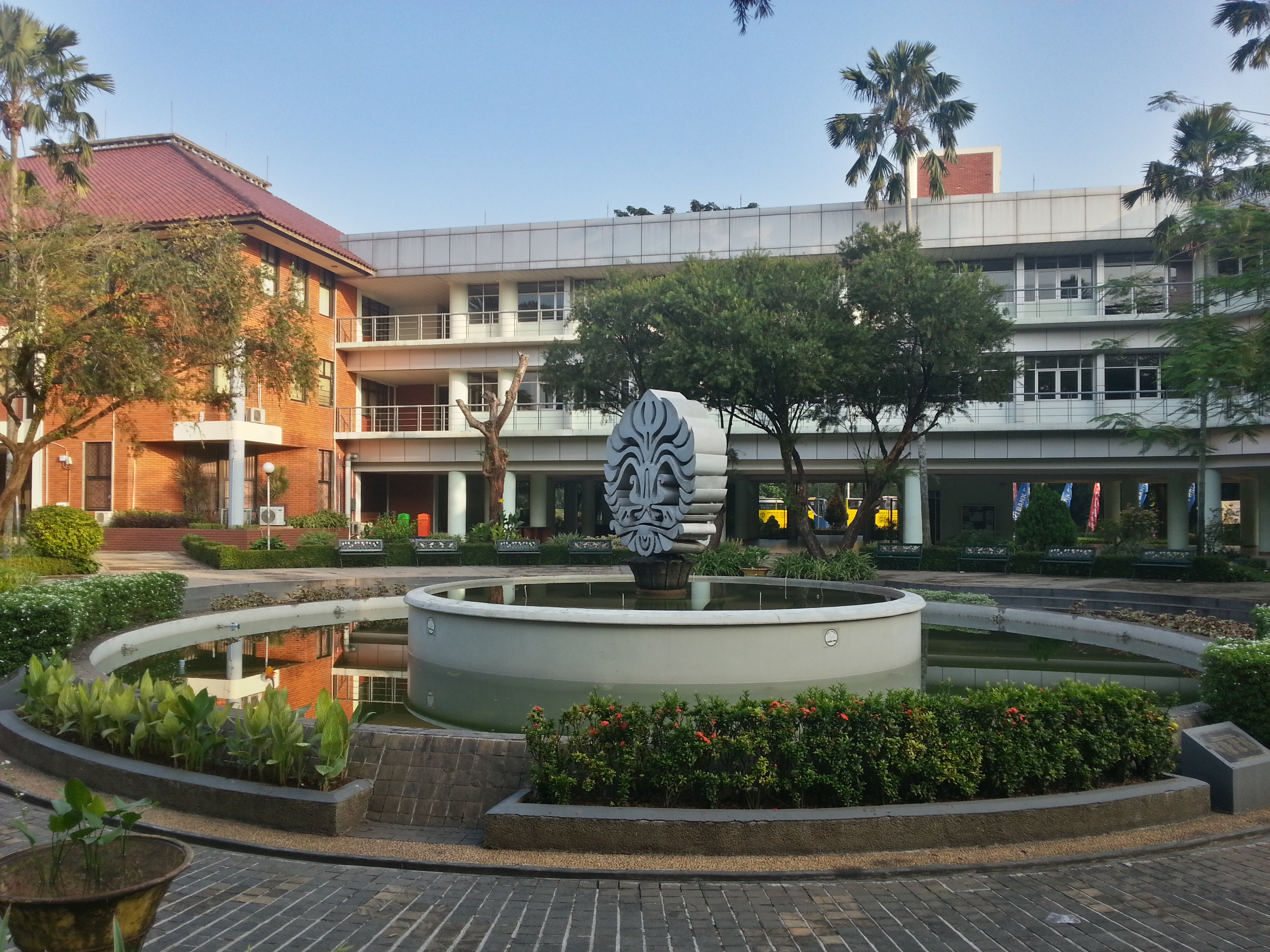
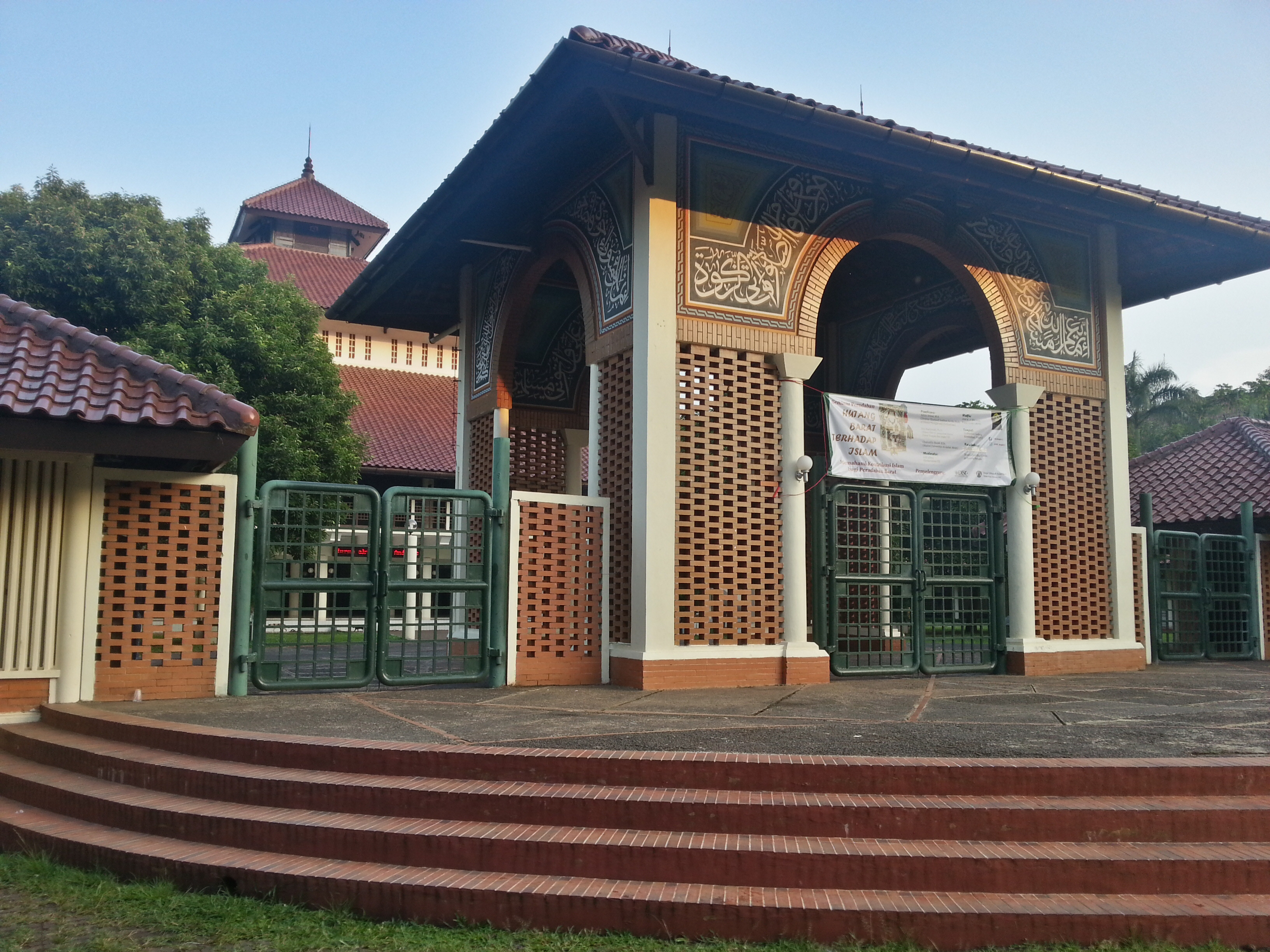
Universitas Indonesia

=== Transportation ===
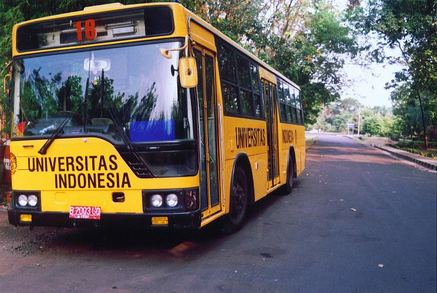
The Yellow Bus in 2008

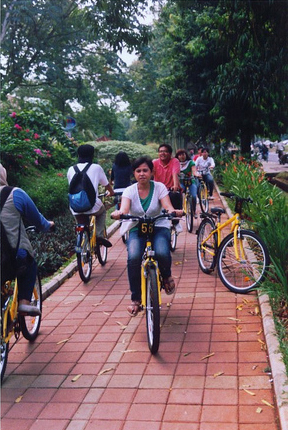
Bicycle path

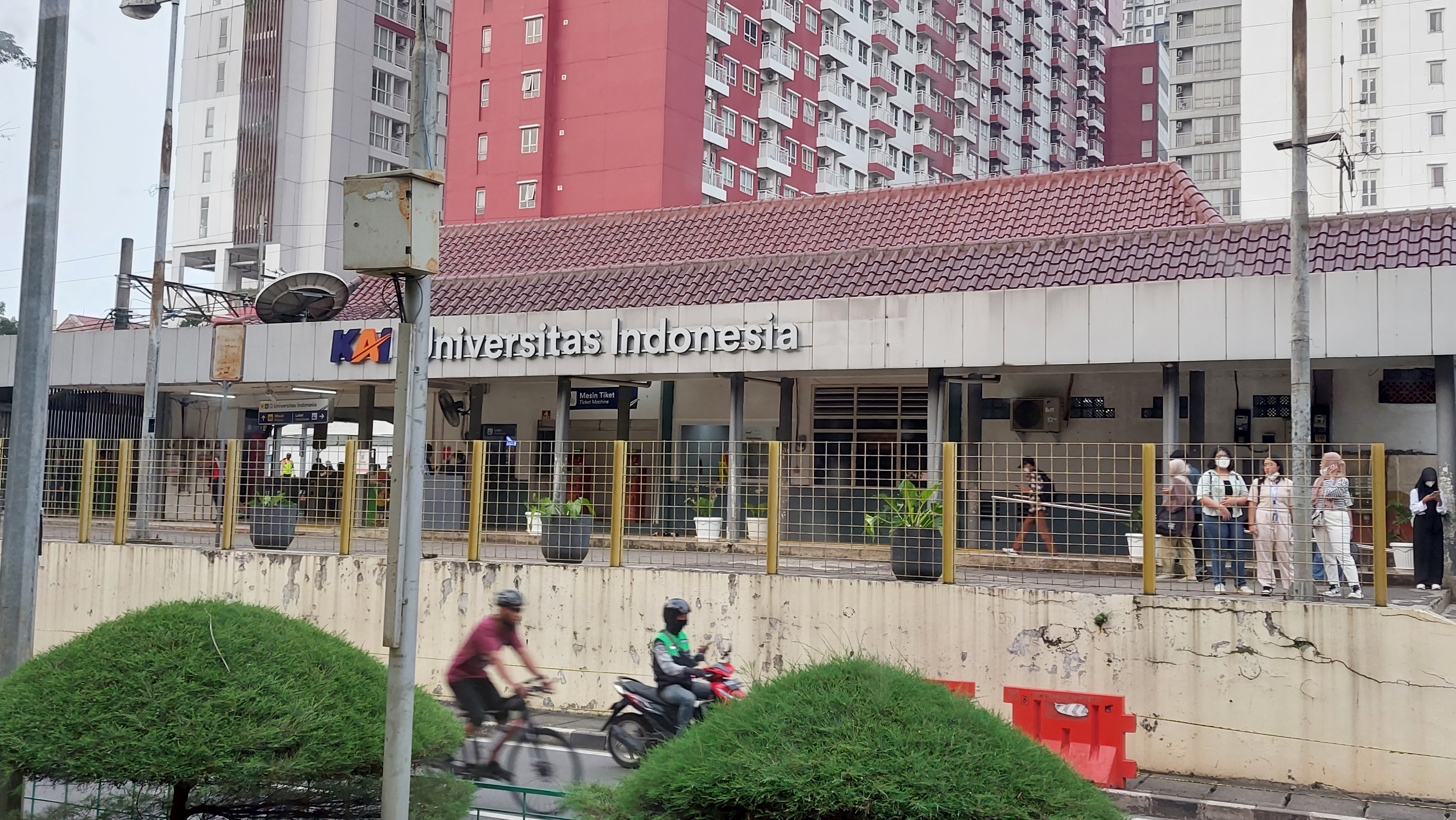
UI Station

Transport Facility

==== Campus bus ====
Campus buses are provided free of charge to serve the transport needs of students within the UI Depok campus. However, this bus can be utilised by local residents for free who use the campus bus as a means of transport to connect the Kukusan area with the Margonda area. Among UI residents and locals, this bus is better known as the Yellow Bus (Bikun), shortened word of "Bis Kuning" or "yellow bus". In 2005, Universitas Indonesia had a total of 20 campus buses. They routinely serve 2 routes within the campus on Monday-Friday, 7:00 AM to 17:00. The two routes are the red route and the blue route. Usually, the red line runs clockwise around UI and blue line runs counter clockwise. A bus tracker website called Bikun Tracker, created by university students, keeps track of the movement of the buses for easy navigation.

==== Campus bike ====
Since July 2008, Universitas Indonesia has offered a bike rental facility to students through the Yellow Bicycle Programme. For the rent, students need to show their UI student card (KTM) to the rental officer. The bike must be used on bike lanes, and it must be returned to a bike station. The return process is identical to borrowing as students must show their KTM to the guard. Though this has largely been replaced by Beam Mobility Electric bikes.

==== Others ====
The Depok campus is served by the on-campus Universitas Indonesia Station and Pondok Cina (outside the campus) stations on the KRL Commuterline rail system, while its Salemba campus is connected with Transjakarta Salemba UI bus station.

=== Health center ===
The polyclinic provides free health services for all UI students, including dentistry and orthodontics. There is also a 300-bed hospital called the RSUI (Rumah Sakit UI) or UI Hospital.

=== Sports ===
Outdoor facilities:

- Hockey field
- Tennis court (3 Lines)
- Basket court (4 Lines)
- Volley court (3 Lines)

Indoor facilities/gymnasium:

- Badminton court
- Volley court

Stadium:

- Football stadium
- Pole vault
- Athletic track

=== Student hall ===
Salemba Student Hall is one of the facilities under the management of the Students Affairs and Alumni Relationship Deputy. The building is often used for events such as seminars, meetings, etc. With a capacity of 300 people, it can be used by UI students and personnel, as well as rented for public use.

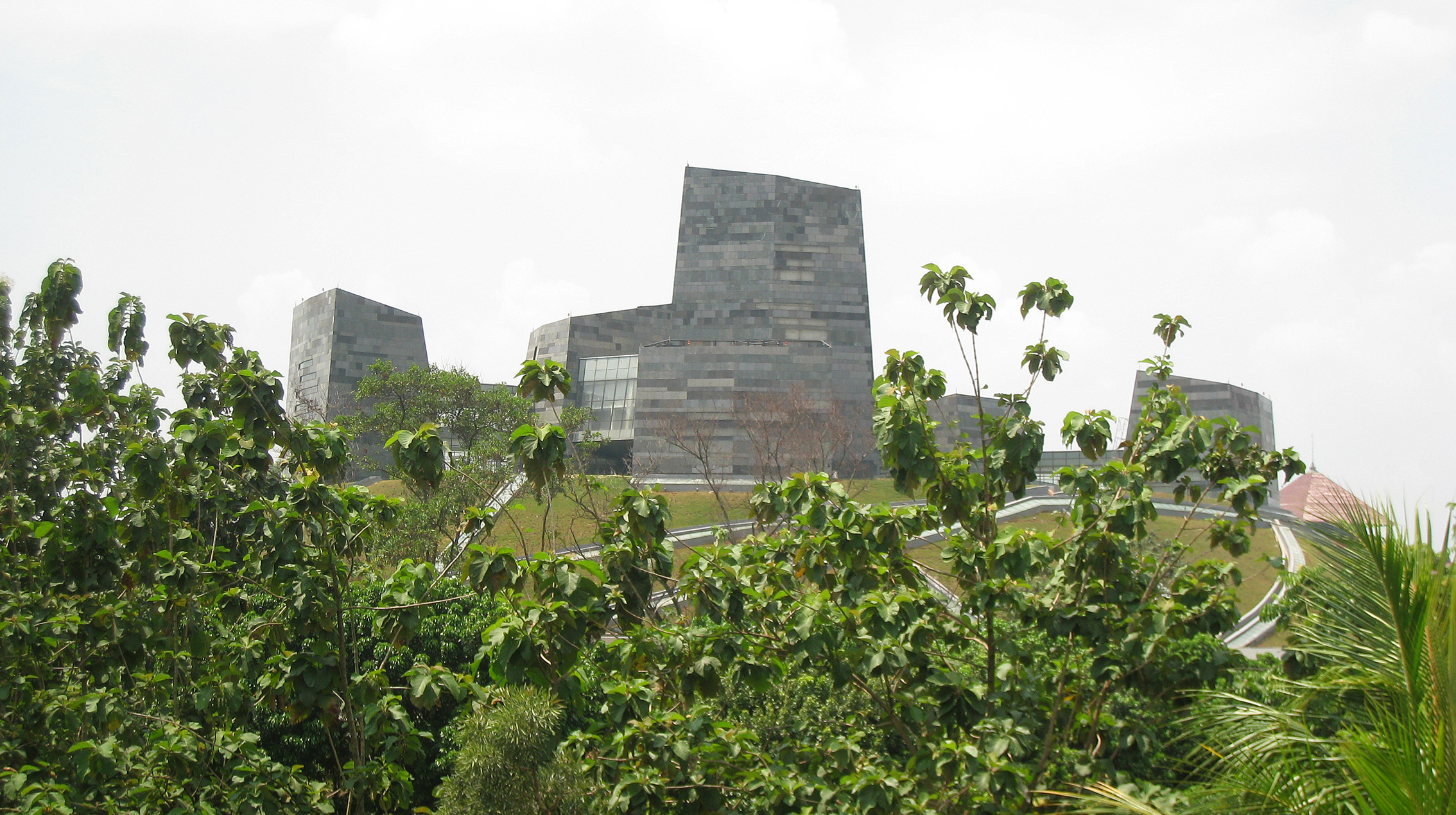
UI Central Library

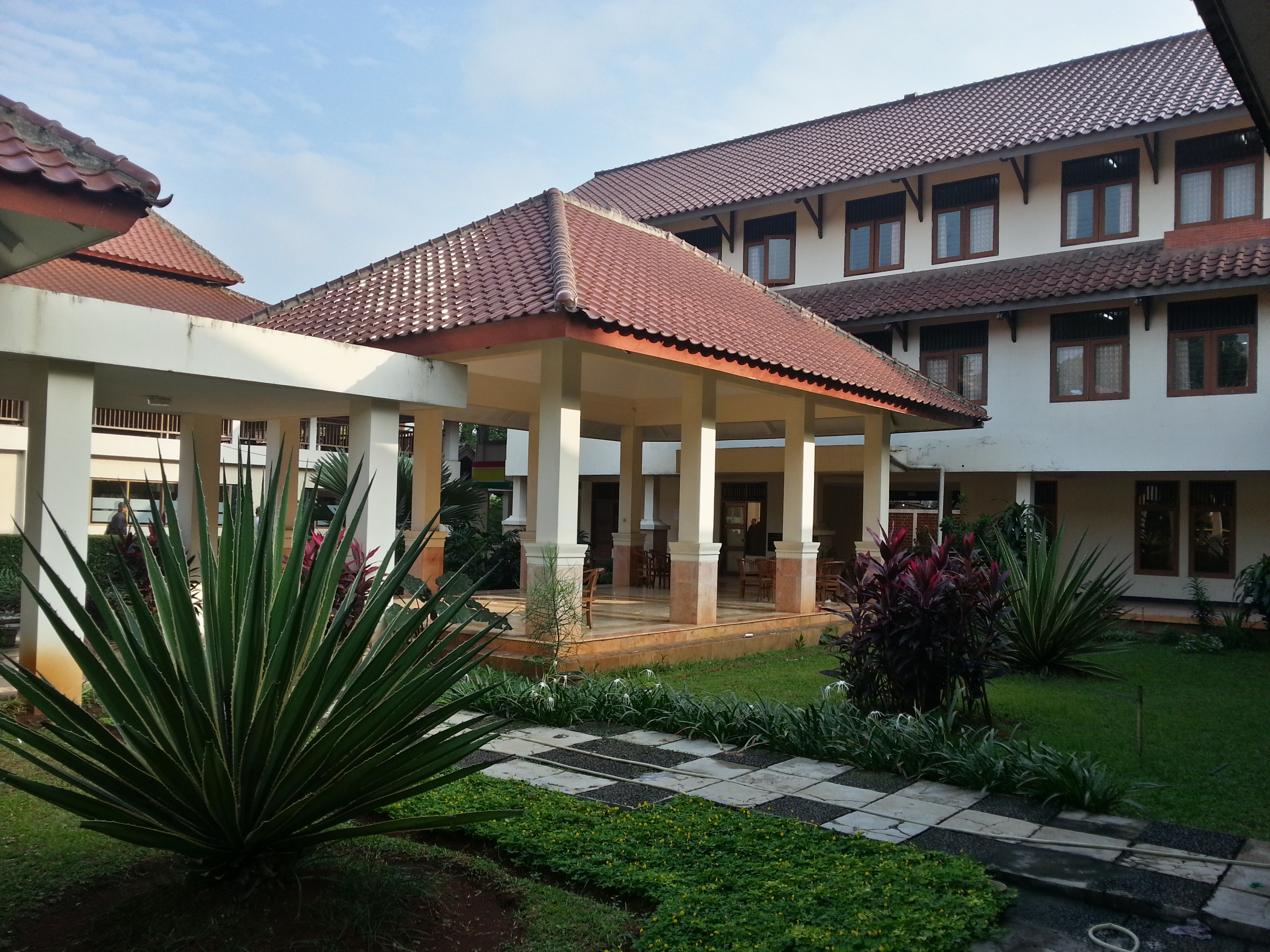
Student Dormitory

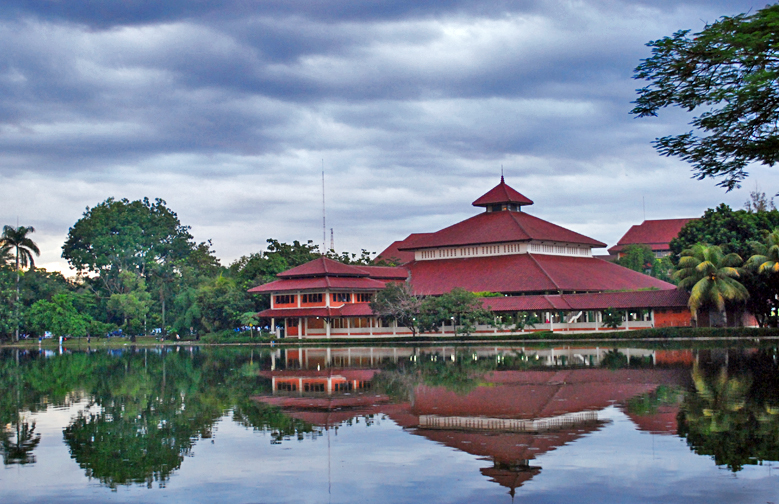
Ukhuwah Islamiyah Mosque

Student Facility

=== Library ===
The library at the Depok campus was launched on May 13, 2011. Built on a 33,000m² area, this library is considered the largest library in Southeast Asia. Designed according to a sustainable building concept, the library powers itself with solar energy. It is smoke-free, green, and economical in terms of electricity, water and paper usage. Universitas Indonesia Library has the capacity to accommodate about 20,000 visitors per day and has a collection of 1,500,000 books.

=== Dormitory ===
Universitas Indonesia has two student dormitories, one in Depok (Asrama UI) and one in Wismarini. The first dormitory is located on the Depok campus and has 480 men's rooms and 615 women's rooms, with each accommodating one to three persons. The Wismarini dormitory is located at Jl. Otto Iskandar no. 38 Jakarta Timur and has 72 men's rooms and 111 women's rooms. The Wismarini dormitory is only for students who take lectures at the Medicine or Dental faculties and any program held at Salemba campus.

Primarily dedicated for students for regular and vocation program, the maximum duration for rent in the Depok dormitory (Asrama UI) is 1 year. The facilities in this dormitory are rooms, canteen, wi-fi, campus bus and campus bike stations, an ATM, prayer area, and security.

=== Mosque ===
==== Masjid Ukhuwah Islamiyah (MUI) ====
Casually pronounced by its abbreviation "MUI". This mosque is in the Depok campus, surrounded by a natural environment and Kenanga Lake. Construction began on January 28, 1987, and it was used for the first time on September 4, 1987, for Friday prayer. There are parking lots in front of the mosque, which is also served by the campus bus.

==== Masjid Arief Rahman Hakim (ARH) at Salemba ====
Construction of this mosque, located in the Salemba campus, was started in 1966 based on a UI rector's decree.

== Academics ==
=== Faculties ===
The university consists of 14 faculties, 1 school, and 1 vocational program providing study programs at the undergraduate, graduate and postgraduate levels. The School of Sustainable Development is exclusive to graduate and postgraduate programs.

No.	Faculty/School	Abbr.	Color	Founded	Cluster	Students (2025)
01	Medicine	FK		1849	Health Sciences	1755
02	Dentistry	FKG		1960	Health Sciences	657
03	Natural Sciences	FMIPA		1960	Science & Technology	4061
04	Engineering	FT		1964	Science & Technology	7978
05	Law	FH		1924	Social & Humanities	3680
06	Economics and Business	FEB		1950	Social & Humanities	4944
07	Humanities	FIB		1940	Social & Humanities	4263
08	Psychology	FPsi		1960	Social & Humanities	1318
09	Social and Political Sciences	FISIP		1968	Social & Humanities	3090
10	Public Health	FKM		1965	Health Sciences	2378
11	Computer Sciences	Fasilkom		1993	Science & Technology	2150
12	Nursing	FIK		1995	Health Sciences	1150
13	Pharmacy	FF		2011	Health Sciences	764
14	Administrative Science	FIA		2015	Social & Humanities	2625
15	Vocational Education	Vokasi		2008	-	5185
16	Sustainable Development	SPPB		2025	-	874

=== Achievements ===
- Christiaan Eijkman (The Director of the Javanese Medical Doctor School, forerunner of the University of Indonesia) was awarded the Nobel Prize in Physiology or Medicine in 1929. He was the first to discover a substance in rice husk, subsequently to be known as vitamin B1, and was also awarded the Prize for his new way of doing research and his method to control diseases caused by vitamin deficiency.
- Members and alumni were elected in 2007 to major national academic positions and became members of President Yudhoyono's cabinet as well as the parliament.
- It is one of the oldest universities in Indonesia, with its roots going back to the establishment in 1848 of the school for Javanese Doctors.
- It is the best Indonesian university according to Globe Asia Magazine 2008.
- It was granted the Indonesia ICT Award (INAICTA) 2008 for the best university in Indonesia in terms of Best IT and Infrastructure under the category of Best Content and Application. UI was recognized in INAICTA 2008 as the university with the best access and connectivity.
- The best university in ICT in Indonesia and The first champion of Collective Knowledge and Robust Applications, Infrastruktur – The Most Manage Local Node and Managing Excellence for Outstanding Individuals on Telkom Smart Campus (TESCA) 2010
- Awarded first prize in the Telcom Smart Campus Award Tesca 2010 for collective Knowledge and Robust Applications.

== Student organizations ==
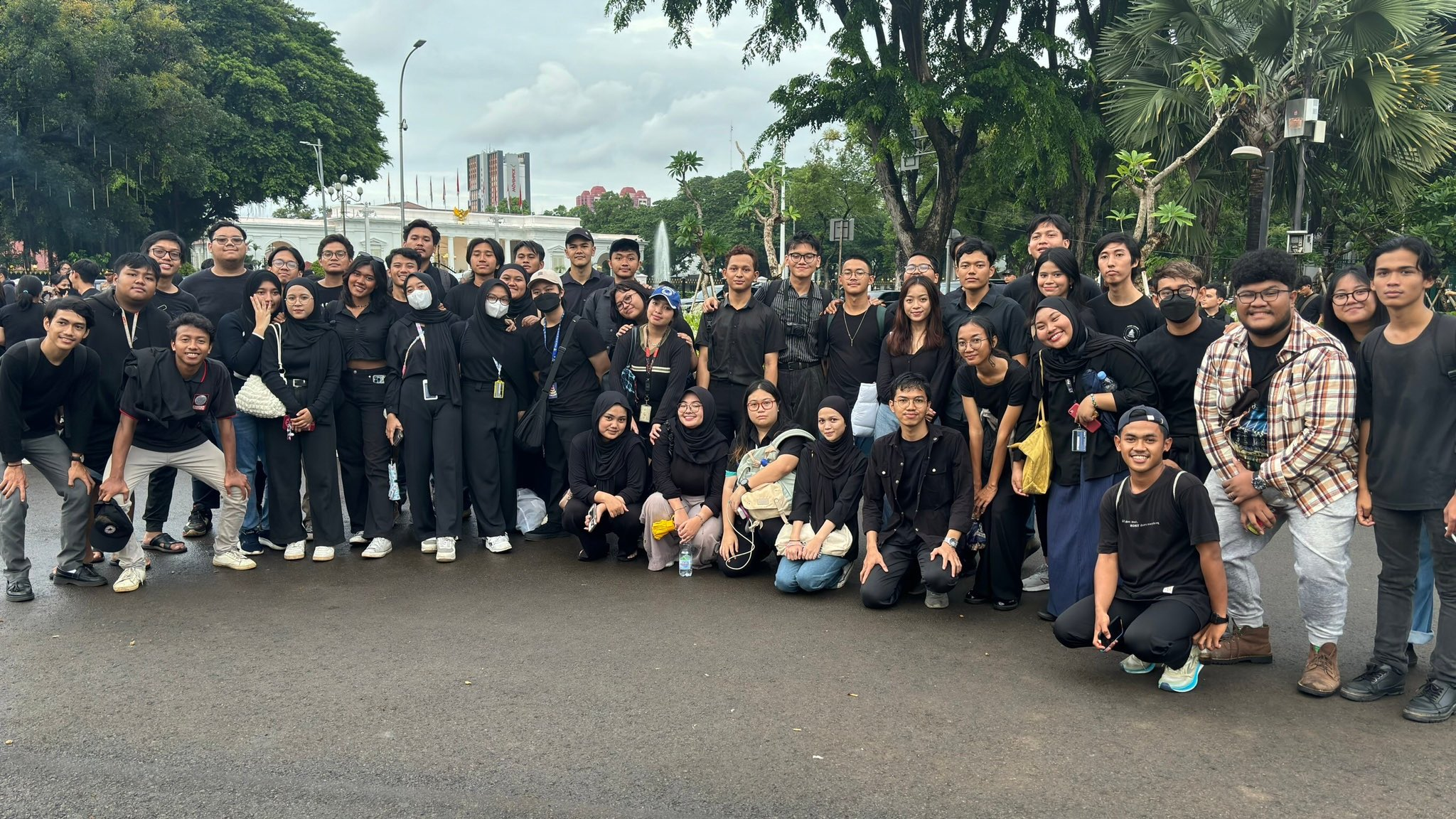
UI students at Aksi Kamisan (2024)

Universitas Indonesia offers students a wide range of organizational activities, those are:

- The Student Representatives Council (DPM, Indonesian: Dewan Perwakilan Mahasiswa): the student legislative body at the university level;
- The Student Executive Board (BEM, Indonesian: Badan Eksekutif Mahasiswa): the student executive body at the university level and faculty level;
- SALAM UI (Nuansa Islam Mahasiswa Universitas Indonesia); the student Moslem organization at the university level;
- PO UI (Persekutuan Oikumene Universitas Indonesia); the Protestant student organization at the university level;
- SUMA UI (Suara Mahasiswa Universitas Indonesia); the student press organization at the university level;
- KMB UI (Keluarga Mahasiswa Buddhis Universitas Indonesia); the Buddhist student organization at the university level;
- KMK UI (Keluarga Mahasiswa Katolik Universitas Indonesia); the Catholic student organization at the university level;
- KMHD UI (Keluarga Mahasiswa Hindu Dharma Universitas Indonesia); the Hindu student organization at the university level;
- The Units for Student Activities constitutes a medium for student activities at the university level with the purpose of developing students' hobbies, interests and talents. They are:
  - Arts: Marching Band Madah Bahana, Mahawaditra Symphony Orchestra, Paragita Student Choir, Ballroom Dance (Dancesport), Dance Group Krida Budaya, and a Theater Group.
  - Sports: Equestrian Club, Badminton, Hockey, Volleyball, Soccer, Table Tennis, Tennis, Basket Ball, Swimming, Bridge, Athletic, and Softball.
  - Martial Art: Silat Merpati Putih, Aikido, Tae Kwon Do, Sin Lam Ba.
  - Others: Islamic Students Association (Salam UI), Ministry of Christian Students (PO UI), Wira Makara Student Regiment Group, Student's Association for Nature, Foreign Policy Community of Indonesia Chapter UI (FPCI UI), Association internationale des étudiants en sciences économiques et commerciales (AIESEC UI), Eka Prasetya Study Group (KSM Eka Prasetya), Entrepreneurship Club CEDS, English Debating Society (EDS), Catholic Students Assembly, Journalistic Club (SUMA), Students Radio Station (RTC UI), UI Model United Nations Club (UI MUN Club).

== Rankings ==
University rankings

Global – Overall
- QS World: 189 (2026)
- QS Employability: 251-300 (2022)
- THE World: 801-1000 (2022)
- USNWR Global: 878 (2022)

Regional – Overall
- QS Asia: 56 (2022)
- THE Asia: 201-250 (2022)
- USNWR Asia: 217 (2022)

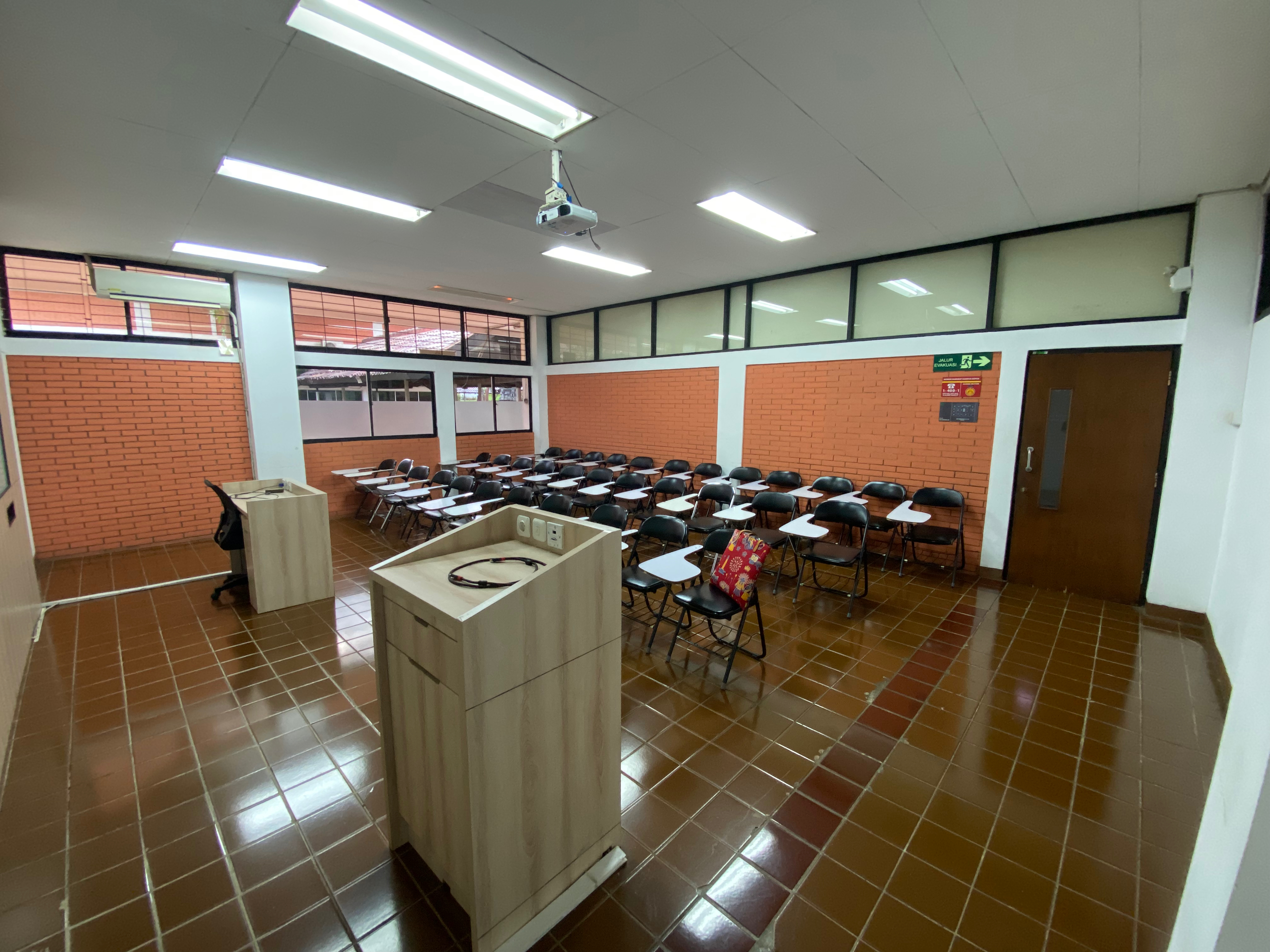
A classroom in the Faculty of Humanities

In the QS World University Rankings 2019, Universitas Indonesia is still the highest-ranked Indonesian school. UI has fallen in the world rankings this year, from 277th (2018 ranking) down to 292nd (2019 ranking), yet UI has moved up one spot from 58th to 57th in Asia. In 2022, UI ranked 290th globally and 56th in Asia.

However, in the Times Higher Education Rankings 2019, UI dramatically rose this year, climbing 200 spots from 801-1000th to the range of 601-800th in the world. However, in the 2020, UI ranked 801-1000th in global and ranked 162nd in Asia.

In 2022, UI ranked as the best university in Indonesia and a tie world ranking of 878 and 217 in Asia according to US News 2022 Best Global Universities Rankings.

In 2010, according to University Ranking by Academic Performance (URAP), Universitas Indonesia was the best university in Indonesia and 1,463rd university in the world. The university scored higher than any other Indonesian university in the Times Higher Education-QS World University Rankings of 2006 [250]. It ranked number 395 in 2007 and 287th in 2008. Now, Universitas Indonesia is placed at 201 on the 2009 World University Rankings. Based on Quacquarelli Symonds (QS) Asian Top Universities, published in May 2011, Universitas Indonesia rank was 50th place in Asia. In social science and management, UI secured in 14th position and followed by art and humanities at 19th, life sciences and medicine at 25th, while in IT and engineering it came in 52nd.

According to the latest survey of Globe Asia (2008), UI ranked first among the top universities in Indonesia This report has been supported by a leading Indonesian magazine Tempo, which carried out a survey and analysis to rank universities and education in Indonesia.

- UI was granted the Indonesia ICT Award (INAICTA) 2008 for the best university in Indonesia in terms of Best IT and Infrastructure under the category of Best Content and Application. UI was recognized in INAICTA 2008 as the university with the best access and connectivity.
- UI has a training center in CDMA and NGN in collaboration with Huawei and the Ministry of Information Technology and Communication.
- Through a green campus initiative, more than 40,000 members of UI community support, promote and ensure a sustainable future in which global warming is the main concern. Ten kilometers of bicycle track were built across the Depok campus in 2008.
- UI has greatly improved its ranking during the last three years. UI ranked 201 in Times Higher Education (THES) world university ranking, 287 in THES 2008 as a world class university and ranked 395 in THES 2007. In 2010, UI rank was dropped to 236 in THES but still as the leading Indonesian university.
- UI remains as one of the top 50 most prestigious universities in Asia by QS World University rankings for two consecutive years (2009–2010) and the only Indonesian university on the list.
- In 2019 got the 2nd best position (the previous rank was 6th position in 2018) at the university's National Ranking from the Ministry of Research and Technology.

=== Subjects ===
QS World University Rankings by Subject 2026

World rank	Subject
51 – 100	▲ Law & Legal Studies; ▲ Anthropology; Dentistry; Library & Information Management
101 – 150	Accounting & Finance; Social Policy & Administration
151 – 200	▲ Architecture & Built Environment; ▲ Sociology; English Language and Literature; Economics & Econometrics; ▼ Politics & International Studies; ▼ Geography; ▼ Modern Languages
201 – 250	Business & Management Studies; Communication & Media Studies; ▼ Development Studies
251 – 300	▲ Computer Science and Information Systems; ▼ Linguistics; ▼ Medicine
301 – 350	▲ Pharmacy & Pharmacology; ▲ Mechanical, Aeronautical & Manufacturing Engineering; Psychology; Chemical Engineering; Electrical and Electronic Engineering
351 – 400	
401 – 450	▲ Physics & Astronomy; Material Sciences
451 – 500	▲ Environmental Sciences; Mathematics
501 – 550	Biological Sciences
551 – 600	Chemistry

QS by Clusters (2026)
Subject	Global	National
Arts & Humanities	▲168	1
Engineering and Technology	▲262	▲2
Life Sciences & Medicine	▲281	1
Natural Sciences	451-500	2
Social Sciences & Management	▲146	1

THE World University Rankings by Subject 2026
Subject	Global	National
Arts & humanities	401-500	▼3
Business & economics	▼401-500	▼2
Computer science	▼801-1000	▼8
Engineering	801-1000	2
Law	301-400	▼10
Life sciences	601-800	▼2
Medical & Health	501-600	▼2
Physical sciences	▲1001-1250	▲12
Psychology	401-500	1
Social sciences	▼501-600	▼2

== Research organizations ==
The following research organizations also belong to UI:

- UI Directorate for Research and Public Service
- APEC Study Centre UI
- ASEAN Study Center FISIP UI
- Center for Computing and IT (CC IT)
- Center for Environmental Health and Industrial
- Center for Global Civil Society Studies (Pacivis)
- Center for Research on Intergroup Relations and Conflict Resolution (CERIC)
- Center for Excellence Indigenous Biological Resources-Genome Studies (CoE IBR-GS)
- Center for Excellence Nano Science and Technology (CoE NST)
- Center on Child Protection (PUSKAPA)
- Health Research Center for Crisis and Disaster (HRCCD)
- Institute of Human Virology and Cancer Biology (IHVCB).
- Research Group, Studies and Application of Basic Law Science
- Anthropology Laboratory
- Political Science Laboratory
- Sociology Laboratory/ Center for Sociological Studies
- Institute of Demography
- Institute for Law and Society Studies
- Institute for Law and Technology Studies
- Institute for Fiscal Law Studies
- Institute for Civil Code Studies
- Institute for Islam and Islamic Law Studies
- Institute for Competition and Trade Policy Studies
- Institute for Capital Market and Financial Studies
- Institute for Law Institution Studies
- Institute for Sociology of Law and Constitution Studies
- Institute for Psychological Research (LPPsi)
- Institute for Measurement Instrument and Psychological Education Development (LPSP3)
- Institute for Indonesian Formal Law and Judicial System Studies
- Institute for International Law Studies
- Institute for Economic and Social Research (LPEM FEB UI)
- Institute for Applied Psychology (LPT)
- Institute for Law and Economic Studies
- Integrated Laboratory on Endocrinology Science
- Centre of Computer Science's (PUSILKOM)
- Centre for Area and Urban Studies
- Centre for Health Administration and Policy Studies (CHAMPS)
- Centre for Anthropology Studies
- Centre for Australian Studies
- Centre for Disability Studies
- Centre for Health Economic and Policy Studies (PKEKK)
- Centre for European Studies
- Centre for Energy Studies
- Centre for International Relation Studies (CIRES)
- Center for Law and Good Governance Studies (CLGS)
- Centre for Administration Science Studies
- Centre for Social Welfare Science Studies
- Centre for Social Welfare Studies
- Centre for Criminology Studies
- Centre for Social and Political Development Studies
- Centre for Political Studies (Puskapol)
- Centre for Environmental Risk and Safety Studies
- Centre for Middle East and Islamic Studies
- Centre for American Area Studies
- Centre for Applied Geographics Research
- Centre for Family Welfare Research (PUSKA & IMPACT)
- Centre for Societal and Cultural Research (PPKB)
- Centre for Development Institution Research
- Centre for Science and Technology Research
- Centre for Human and Environmental Resources Research
- Centre for Epidemiological Research and Surveillance (PRES)
- Centre for Marine Studies
- Centre for Japanese Studies (PSJ)
- Centre for Natural Product and Medicine Studies
- Centre of Communication Studies
- Centre of Sharia Economics and Business Studies
- Research Centre for Materials Science
- SEAMEO- TROPMED RCCN

== Center of nuclear medicine ==
In cooperation with the National Nuclear Energy Agency (Batan) and the International Atomic Energy Agency, Universitas Indonesia will have a medical physics center at Depok, West Java campus, which will be operated in 2012 as cancer treatment center.

== Notable people ==
UI has produced over 400,000 graduates. Many distinguished figures, both Indonesians and foreigners, were granted the "Doctor Honoris Causa" (Dr. HC) from Universitas Indonesia. Distinguished figures, including: Sri Mulyani Indrawati (Managing Director and COO of World Bank), Jusuf Wanandi (Co-chair of Pacific Economic Cooperation Council (PECC)), Prof. Mr. Sutan Takdir Alisjahbana, Taufik Ismail, Erwin Gutawa, Drs. Hans Bague Jassin received the title Doctor Honoris Causa in literature. Drs. Mohammad Hatta, the first vice president of Indonesia, received Doctor Honoris Causa in law. Prof. Miriam Budiardjo, M. A. received her Doctor Honoris Causa in 1997 in political science. Abdullah Gül, president of the Republic of Turkey, received his Doctor Honoris Causa title on April 6, 2011. Melki Sedek Huang, an activist and sex offender who formerly served as Chairman of UI Student Executive Board, is a law student at the university.

== Controversies ==
On 16 April 2026, 16 students of the law faculty were suspended pending investigation after messages containing explicit remarks about female peers circulated online and prompted public criticism.
