= Indonesia Institute of the Arts Yogyakarta =

Public college of arts in Indonesia

- Javanese: ꦆꦤ꧀ꦱ꧀ꦠꦶꦠꦸꦠ꧀ꦱꦼꦤꦶꦆꦤ꧀ꦢꦺꦴꦤꦺꦱꦶꦪꦔꦪꦺꦴꦒꦾꦏꦂꦠ, romanized: "Institut Seni Indonésia Ngayogyakarta"
- Latin: Institutum Indonesia de Ars Yogyakarta
- Other names: ISI Yogyakarta, ISI Jogja
- Type: Public
- Established: July 23, 1984
- Rector: Dr. Irwandi, M.Sn
- Faculty: 329 lecturers
- Undergraduates: 5,591 (2020)
- Postgraduates: 280 (2020)
- Location: Bantul, Special Region of Yogyakarta, Indonesia; 7°51′08.6″S 110°21′21.21″E
- Campus: Suburban 18 hectares (44 acres)
- Colours: Light Steel Blue
- Mascot: Sarasvatī सरस्वती
- Website: www.isi.ac.id

The Indonesia Institute of the Arts Yogyakarta (Indonesian: Institut Seni Indonesia Yogyakarta, ISI Yogyakarta) is a state-owned college in Bantul Regency, Special Region of Yogyakarta, Indonesia. It teaches visual, performing, and media arts in traditional Indonesian and modern international styles. ISI Yogyakarta was ranked number one in Indonesia on the QS World's Top Performing Arts Schools in 2022. It was founded in 1984 with the merger of the Indonesian College of Fine Arts, the Indonesian Academy of Music, and the Indonesian Dance Academy.

== History ==
The fine arts program of the ISI Yogyakarta has its roots in the Indonesian Academy of Fine Arts (Akademi Seni Rupa Indonesia; ASRI) which was established by governmental decree on December 15, 1949 and inaugurated on January 15, 1950. This fine arts school was re-named the Indonesian College of Fine Arts (Sekolah Tinggi Seni Rupa Indonesia; known as STSRI); although its former name was still often used by the public.

The music program of the ISI Yogyakarta has its beginnings in the Indonesian Music School (Sekolah Musik Indonesia; known as SMI) which was established in 1952. The SMI became the Indonesian Academy of Music (Akademi Musik Indonesia; known as AMI) in 1961.

The origins of the dance program at the ISI Yogyakarta began with the Indonesian Dance Conservatory (Konservatori Tari Indonesia; KONRI) which was founded in 1961. This organization became the Indonesian Dance Academy (Akademi Seni Tari Indonesia; known as ASTI) in 1963.

The ISI Yogyakarta was founded on 23 July 1984 with the merger of the STSRI, the AMI, and the ASTI.

== Administration ==
The Minister of National Education directly appoints its governing board, including president, vice-presidents, and deans. The institute delegates authority to the Senate, composed of professors, faculty members, and top administrative offices, who define the institute policy as a whole, determines and supervises courses and curricula, advises the administrators on budgets, faculty appointments, and promotions.

== Educational programmes ==
ISI Yogyakarta has three schools with 11 departments. They offer a diploma in arts, undergraduate degree (Sarjana degree) in arts, master's degree in arts creation & aesthetic interpretation and arts management and a doctorate degree in arts creation and interpretation.

ISI Yogyakarta might offer a collaborative program with the Royal Melbourne Institute of Technology, Melbourne, Australia.

=== Schools and departments ===
==== Undergraduate degrees ====
- School of Visual Arts
  - Department of Fine Art, offers courses in painting, sculpture, and printmaking
  - Department of Crafts, offers courses in wooden, metal, textile, ceramic, and leather crafts, also
    - Diploma III in Batik and Fashion
  - Department of Design, offers courses in interior design, visual communication design, and product design
  - Department of Arts Management
- School of Performing Arts
  - Department of Dance, offers courses in dance performance, and choreography, modern and traditional
  - Department of Karawitan Music, offers courses in Javanese, Sundanese, and Balinese music performance and composition
  - Department of Ethnomusicology, offers courses in Nusantara archipelago folk music, Asian tribal and classical music traditions
  - Department of Puppetry, offers courses in the artistry of Javanese shadow puppet play
  - Department of Music, offers courses in Western music performance, Western-based school music, musicology and composition
    - Diploma IV in Western Musics Presentation
  - Department of Theatre, offers courses in acting, directing, visual stage-setting, modern and traditional
  - Department of Dramatic and Musical Arts Education cultural arts
- School of Recorded Media Arts
  - Department of Photography, offers courses in photographic art
  - Department of Television, offers courses in television programming
    - Diploma III in Animation

=== Master's degrees ===
- Master of Arts Creation and Interpretation
- Master of Arts Management

=== Doctorate degrees ===
- Doctor of Arts Creation and Interpretation

== Campus ==
ISI Yogyakarta's main campus is in Sewon, 6 km (3.7 mi) south of Yogyakarta. Sewon is the newest campus, with 1,500 m^{2} (16,000 sq ft) of land. It includes an administrative building, studios, academic buildings, auditoriums, pendapa, library, art gallery, the mosque, student's center, tennis court and soccer field.

Jogja Disability Arts, a non-profit art collective advocating for artists with disability in Indonesia is located on the second floor of the RJ Katamsi Gallery, which is located at the Sewon campus.

Two former campuses are the former ASRI campus at Gampingan and AMI campus at Suryodiningratan. The former AMI campus at Suryodiningratan is now the campus building for master and doctorate programs.

== Students ==
ISI Yogyakarta enrolls about 2,000 students from all over the country, mainly from Java and Sumatra. ISI Yogyakarta also welcomes overseas students who are interested in learning Indonesian traditional arts, mostly in a non-degree programs. Courses on traditional dance, karawitan, and batik are the most popular study programs for foreign students.

== Alumni ==
- Heri Dono, artist
- Luluk Purwanto, jazz violinist
- Kustiyah, painter
- Edhi Sunarso, sculptor
- Danarto, artist
- Salma Salsabil, singer-songwriter
