= Probosutedjo =

- Born: 1 May 1930; Kemusuk, Yogyakarta, Dutch East Indies
- Died: 26 March 2018 (aged 87); Jakarta, Indonesia
- Resting place: Kemusuk, Bantul Regency, Special Region of Yogyakarta
- Occupation: Businessman
- Spouse: Ratmani
- Children: 6

Probosutedjo (1 May 1930 – 26 March 2018) was a businessman and the younger half-brother of former Indonesian president Suharto. Like many Indonesians, he took only one name. Probosutedjo was one of seven children from his mother's second marriage, his father being Atmopawiro and his mother (also Suharto's mother) Sukirah. Like Suharto, he was born and raised in the small hamlet of Kemusuk to the west of the main town of Yogyakarta. (Suharto was the only child of their mother's first marriage).

For most of his life, Probosutedjo maintained a close relationship with Suharto. Probosutedjo's business activities flourished under Suharto's New Order government. He developed business opportunities in the forestry sector, having founded the PT Menara Hutan Buana company to carry out forestry activities. During the period of the New Order government, he co-founded the Indonesian Indigenous Entrepreneurs Association (HIPPI), a move that reportedly drew the ire of president Suharto.

In the 1980s, he was active in supporting the establishment of the Mercu Buana University in Indonesia with several campuses in various parts of Jakarta.

During the 1970s, some of Probosutedjo's activities became the focus of corruption allegations. In 2003, he was tried and convicted for corruption and the loss of $10 million from the Indonesian state. He was sentenced to four years in jail. He later won a reduction of his sentence to two years, initiating a probe by the Indonesian Corruption Eradication Commission into the alleged scandal of the "judicial mafia" which uncovered offers of $600,000 to various judges. Probosutedjo confessed to the scheme in October 2005, leading to the arrest of his lawyers. His full four-year term was reinstated. After a brief standoff at a hospital, in which he was reportedly protected by a group of police officers, he was arrested on 30 November 2005.

Like other members of the extended Suharto family, he remained a supporter of his brother's activities after Suharto's death in 2008. He joined with others in recalling personal memories about Suharto in a book, Pak Harto: The untold stories, published in 2011. And in 2013, he supported the publication of a book of anecdotes from palace-based reporters remembering Suharto entitled 34 Palace Journalists talk about Pak Harto.

Probosutedjo died on 26 March 2018 at the Cipto Mangunkusumo Hospital in Jakarta. Later the same day his body was taken to his home village of Kemusuk near Yogyakarta accompanied by his family and members of the Suharto family including Titiek Suharto and Mamiek Suharto. A large crowd of local people from the Kemusuk area attended a ceremony for his burial in the local Soemenggalan cemetery.
