= Kasihan =

- Kapanewon
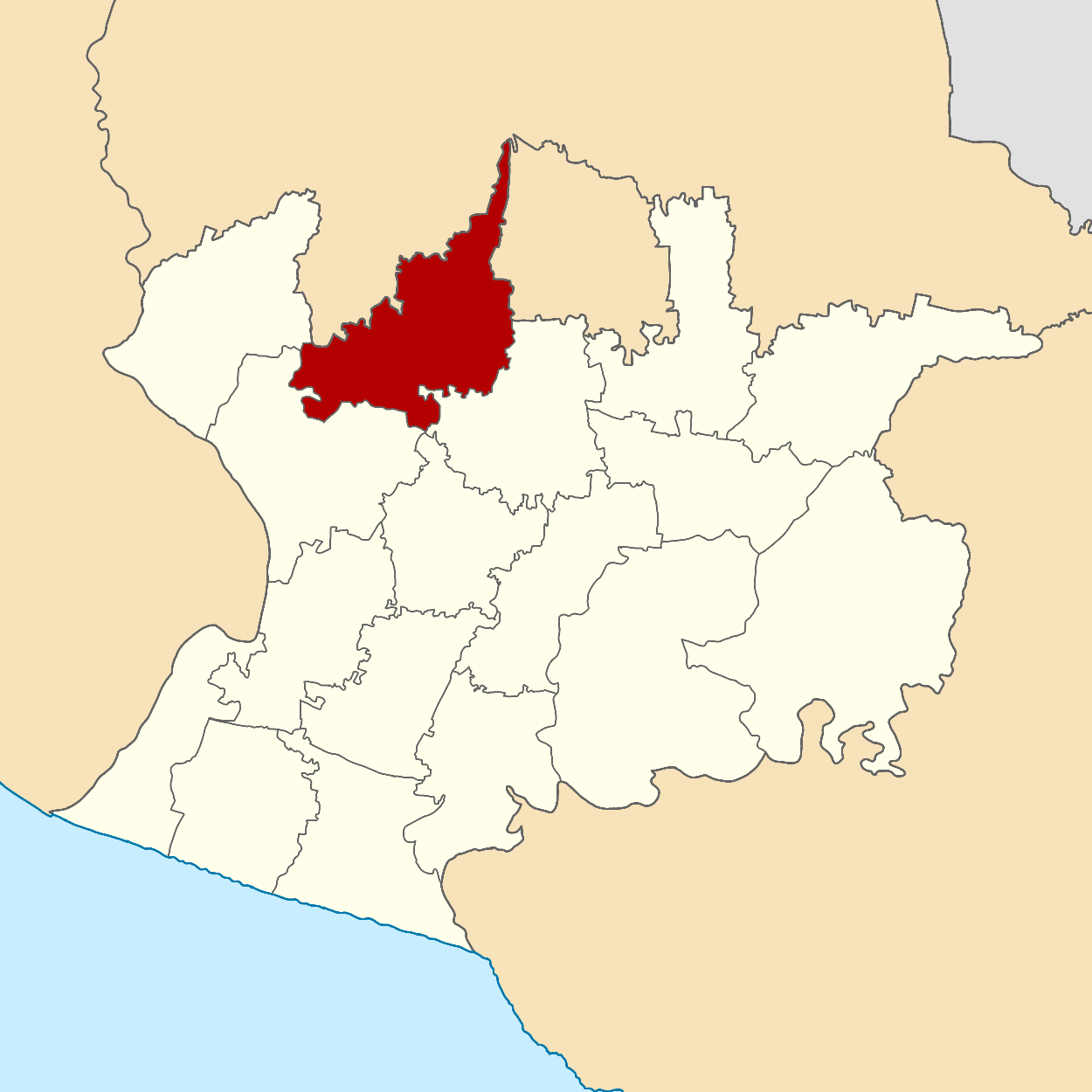
- Map of Bantul Regency with Kasihan highlighted
- Country: Indonesia
- Province: Special Region of Yogyakarta
- Regency: Bantul Regency

Area
  - Total: 27.902 km^{2} (10.773 sq mi)

Population (2023)
  - Total: 120,920
  - Density: 4,333.7/km^{2} (11,224/sq mi)
- Time zone: UTC+07:00 (WIB)
- Postal Code: 55181 - 55184

Kasihan is an administrative district (kapanewon) in Bantul Regency, Special Region of Yogyakarta, Indonesia.
