= Andrey Dolgov (ship) =

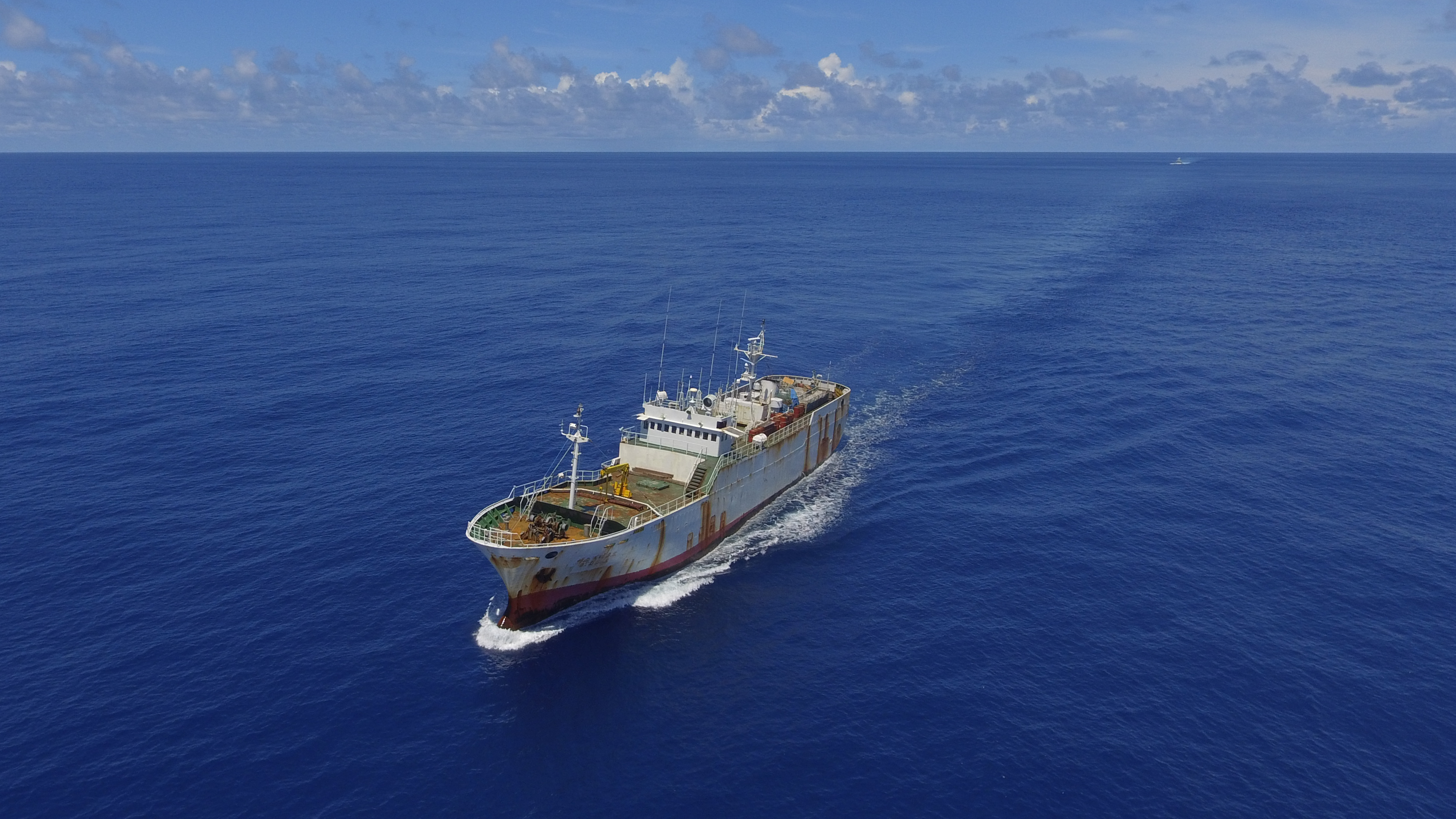
- Photographed by Sea Shepherd Global in 2018

History
- Name: Andrey Dolgov, STS-50, Ayda, SEA BREEZ 1, SUN TAI NO. 2, SUNTAI NO.2
- Builder: KK Kanasashi Zosen shipyard
- Launched: 1985
- In service: 1985
- Out of service: 2018
- Identification: IMO number: 7379565
- Fate: Detained by Indonesia in April 2018
- Status: Undergoing conversion into an anti-IUU vessel as of February 2019

General characteristics
- Type: longline fishing vessel (possibly converted into a fish carrier or trawler)
- Tonnage: 570 gross tons
- Length: 53.5 meters
- Depth: 3.76 meters
- Crew: 20

Andrey Dolgov is a former long-line fishing boat. During the 2000s and 2010s, the ship—which was engaged in a far-reaching campaign of illegal fishing—was one of Interpol's most wanted ships. The Andrey Dolgov was captured and detained by the Indonesian navy in April 2018; as of 2019 the Indonesian government intended to refurbish the ship and incorporate it into Indonesia's fisheries enforcement fleet.

== Description ==
=== History ===
Andrey Dolgov is a steel-hulled fishing vessel. Despite gill nets being found on-board, the ship may have operated as a fish carrier. The ship was built in Shimizu-ku Japan in 1985 for the Maruha Nichiro Corporation, and was intended for the tuna trade. The ship served with the Japanese fishing fleet before being acquired by a number of fishing concerns; her last legal owners were registered in South Korea.

As of 2008, Andrey operated as an illegal fishing vessel. Sailing under a number of names, the ship frequently engaged in illegal fishing operations in the Pacific, Indian, and Southern Oceans. If threatened with the approach of law enforcement, Andrey would flee for international waters, where most national navies and law enforcement had no legal jurisdiction. The ship would unload its catches in a number of Asian countries, and would often misreport the type of fish being offloaded to avoid sanctions. At some point between 2008 and 2015, the ship was reconfigured so that it could it take part in the lucrative illegal toothfish fishery. The ship changed its country of registry regularly, and flew several national flags. The ship would reportedly bring in around $6 million worth of catch per trip.

In 2016, authorities in China found illegally-caught toothfish being unloaded from the ship; however, before an investigation could commence, the ship fled China and sailed for the Indian Ocean. In light of this event, the now-wanted ship was listed as IUU—a label applied to ships believed to be involved in unreported and unregulated fishing.

Later in 2016, Andrey Dolgov and her crew tried to dock in Mauritius but were denied entry. In 2017, the ship (now renamed Sea Breez 1 and flying the flag of Togo) moved from port to port, often using forged documents to deceive authorities. When Togo stuck the ship from its registry, the vessel's name was changed to Ayda. It also intermittently flew the flags of eight nations (some of which had denounced and de-registered the ship) in an effort to confuse authorities. In January 2018, Interpol issued a Purple Notice in regard to the ship, indicating it was wanted for illegal and unregulated fishing.

In February 2018, the wanted ship was detected when it docked in Madagascar. Local authorities alerted CCAMLR (a multinational body responsible for enforcing edicts made via the Antarctic Treaty System) after it was discovered that the ship in port (which was operating using the name STS-50) was using a fake International Marine Organization number and was in possession of forged documents. However, attempts to detain the rogue vessel failed and Andrey Dolgov was able to evade capture.

Following Andrey's escape from Madagascar, attempts were made to track the vessel via a transponder the ship was using to communicate with the international Vessel Traffic Service. The service, which uses the Automatic identification system (AIS) to track the location of thousands of ships, is normally used to help ships navigate and avoid collisions. It was hoped that, by finding the outlaw fisher's locations via its AIS-linked transponder, the ship could be tracked, pursued, and captured. However, it was found that Andrey Dolgov was producing (described as "spoofing" by one source) a number of fake signatures. According to OceanMind, a non-profit assisting in the hunt for the Andrey Dolgov, the wanted ship was able to simultaneously appear near the Falklands Islands, Fiji, and Norway. At some points, the method used by the ship caused its signature to appear in nearly 100 places at once.

Andrey Dolgov (now operating under the name F/V STS-50) was next spotted near Maputo, Mozambique in March 2018. While the ship was anchored in Maputo Bay, she was successfully detained by Mozambican authorities after her documents were found to be forgeries. The ship's crew was briefly taken into custody, and their passports seized. However, her crew was able to regain control of Andrey Dolgov and successfully escaped the Mozambicans.

=== Capture ===
Following the third escape of the Andrey Dolgov, several African countries and international organizations began a concerted effort to hunt down the outlaw ship. At the request of Mozambique, Fish-i Africa (a multinational anti-illegal fishing force comprising 8 East African nations) dispatched ships to search for Andrey Dolgov, while a number of non-profit organizations and Interpol lent their support to find the ship. Eventually the ship was picked up on radar (which was then cross-referenced with AIS pings to determine the Andrey Dolgov's location), and the fleeing vessel was soon being pursued by the Sea Shepherd's MY Ocean Warrior and the Tanzanian navy.

After a three-week pursuit across the Indian Ocean, Andrey Dolgov fled into the territorial waters of the Seychelles, forcing the Tanzanian ships to turn back as they did not have the legal jurisdiction to board a vessel in those waters. However, the Tanzanians and Sea Shepherd were able to record information about Andrey Dolgov's speed and heading; this data was passed onto other groups following the chase and eventually forwarded to the Indonesian navy.

As the ship continued to flee eastward, she entered the shipping-crowded Strait of Malacca. There, Andrey Dolgov's AIS signal was lost among the hundreds of other signals being generated by other ships in the area. However, the Indonesian navy was able to use the data collected by the outlaws pursuers to coordinate an effort to find the ship; Susi Pudjiastuti, Indonesia's Minister of Maritime Affairs and Fisheries, gave the order to intercept the ship.

On 6 April 2018, Andrey Dolgov was captured by the Indonesian patrol boat KRI Simeulue 2, which made visual contact with and intercepted the Andrey Dolgov 60 miles off the coast of Weh Island. The ship was stopped and her crew detained, ending the hunt for the Andrey Dolgov.

Upon their capture, the 20-man crew of the Andrey Dolgov were found to be from three nations; the captain and six officers were either Russian or Ukrainian, while 14 crew were Indonesian. Many of the Indonesians said they did not know the vessel was operating illegally, and the Indonesian government noted that the men were likely forced laborers. The seizure of the ship's logs revealed that the ship was registered to Red Star Company Ltd, a company based in Belize; a tracking of bank accounts connected to the ship indicated to Interpol that the ship was tied to organized crime in Russia.

=== Future ===
Having captured the rogue ship, the Indonesian government had the option to destroy or maintain possession of the vessel as a prize. The Indonesian government elected to maintain the ship. As of February 2019, the ship is expected to join the Indonesian fisheries enforcement fleet.
