= SMA Negeri 1 Yogyakarta =

Location
- Jalan HOS Cokroaminoto 10; Wirobrajan, Yogyakarta; Yogyakarta, Special Region of Yogyakarta 55221; Indonesia

Information
- Type: Public, Coeducation
- Motto: "Teladan Jayamahe" (Glory, Glory for Eternity)
- Established: 1957
- Headmaster: Drs. Zamroni, M.PdI.
- Campus type: Urban
- Athletics: Soccer, Badminton, Indoor soccer, Basketball, Volleyball
- Accreditation: A
- Test average: 39.00 out of 40.00 (2012)
- Affiliation: Keluarga Alumni Teladan Yogyakarta

SMA Negeri 1 Yogyakarta also known as SMA Teladan is a public government high school in Special Region of Yogyakarta, Indonesia. It is located in H.O.S. Cokroaminoto street, no. 10, Pakuncen, in the Wirobrajan sub-district of Yogyakarta. The school was founded in the Dutch colonial era as an Algemeene middelbare school, a type of secondary school. It became an Exemplary High School Part A on 1 December 1957, and was upgraded to Parts ABC by a Ministry of Education and Culture order in 1962, teaching cultural linguistics, exact sciences and social economics. In 1961 the school pioneered a programme of student guidance counselling, which became a model for schools in Indonesia. In 2005, it was accredited by the University of Cambridge as a Cambridge Centre. In 2022 the school ranked 13th out of 1,000 Indonesian schools in scores calculated by the Higher Education Entrance Test Institute .

Susi Pudjiastuti, entrepreneur and a former Minister of Marine Affairs and Fisheries is a notable alumni. Muhammad Prakosa (1960-2023) member of the Indonesia House of Representatives, Minister of Agriculture and Minister of Forestry attended the school from 1974 to 1977.
