= Early life and career of Suharto =

Suharto
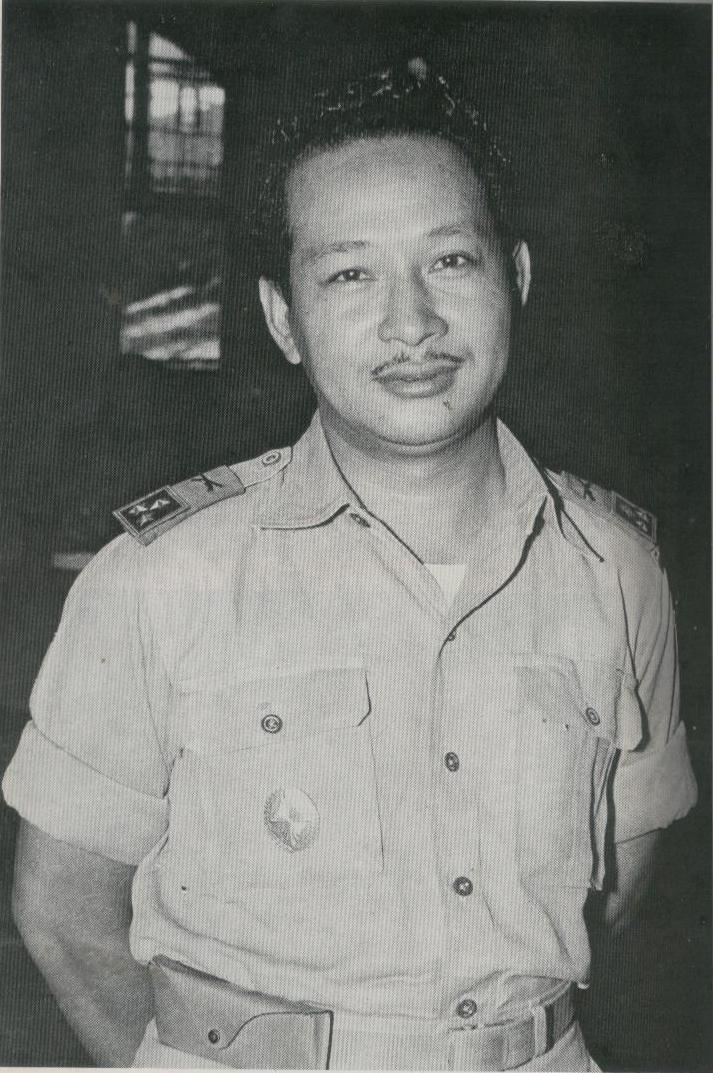
- Suharto, as commander of Kodam IV/Diponegoro, c. 1957
- Born: 8 June 1921; Kemusuk, Dutch East Indies
- Died: 27 January 2008 (aged 86); Jakarta, Indonesia
- Military career
- Allegiance: Dutch East Indies; Empire of Japan; Indonesia
- Branch: KNIL (1940–42); PETA (1942–45); Indonesian Army (1945–74)
- Service years: 1940–1974
- Rank: General of the Army
- Unit: Kostrad
- Commands: Kodam IV/Diponegoro; Kostrad; Indonesian Army; Indonesian National Armed Forces
- Conflicts: Indonesian National Revolution: Operation Product; Madiun Affair; Operation Kraai; March general offensive; Makassar Uprising; Darul Islam Rebellion; West New Guinea dispute Operation Trikora; Indonesia–Malaysia confrontation Indonesian mass killings of 1965–66
- Other work: President of Indonesia (1967–1998)

Suharto (8 June 1921 – 27 January 2008) was the second President of Indonesia, having held the office for 31 years from 1967 following Sukarno's removal until his resignation in 1998.

Suharto was born in a small village, Kemusuk, in the Godean area near Yogyakarta, during the Dutch colonial era. He grew up in humble circumstances. His Javanese Muslim parents divorced not long after his birth, and he was passed between foster parents for much of his childhood. During the Japanese occupation of the Dutch East Indies, Suharto served in Japanese-organised Indonesian security forces. Indonesia's independence struggle saw him joining the newly formed Indonesian army. Suharto rose to the rank of major general following Indonesian independence.

== Early life ==
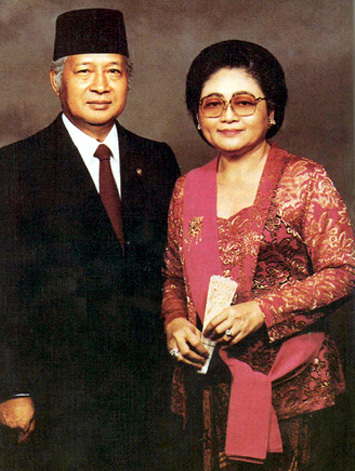
Official portrait of Suharto and First Lady Siti Hartinah

Suharto was born on 8 June 1921 during the Dutch East Indies era, in a plaited bamboo walled house in the hamlet of Kemusuk, a part of the larger village of Godean. The village is 15 kilometres (9.3 mi) west of Yogyakarta, the cultural heartland of the Javanese. Born to ethnic Javanese parents of peasant class, he was the only child of his father's second marriage. His father, Kertosudiro had two children from his previous marriage, and was a village irrigation official. His mother Sukirah, a local woman, was distantly related to Sultan Hamengkubuwono V by his first concubine.

Five weeks after Suharto's birth, his mother suffered a nervous breakdown and he was placed in the care of his paternal great-aunt, Kromodirjo. Kertosudiro and Sukirah divorced early in Suharto's life and both later remarried. At the age of three, Suharto was returned to his mother who had remarried a local farmer whom Suharto helped in the rice paddies. In 1929, Suharto's father took him to live with his sister who was married to an agricultural supervisor, Prawirowihardjo, in the town of Wuryantoro in a poor and low-yield farming area near Wonogiri. Over the following two years, he was taken back to his mother in Kemusuk by his stepfather and then back again to Wuryantoro by his father.

Prawirowihardjo took to raising the boy as his own, which provided Suharto a father-figure and a stable home in Wuryantoro. In 1931, he moved to town of Wonogiri to attend the primary school (schakelschool), living first with Prawirohardjo's son Sulardi, and later with his father's relative Hardjowijono. While living with Hardjowijono, Suharto became acquainted with Darjatmo, a dukun ("guru") of Javanese mystical arts and faith healing. The experience deeply affected him and later, as president, Suharto surrounded himself with powerful symbolic language. Difficulties in paying the fees for his education in Wonogiri resulted in another move back with his father in Kemusuk, where he continued studying at a lower-fee, Schakel Muhammadiyah (middle school) in the city of Yogyakarta until 1938.

Like many Javanese, Suharto had only one name. In religious contexts in recent years he has sometimes been called "Haji" or "el-Haj Mohammed Suharto" but these names were not part of his formal name or generally used. The spelling "Suharto" reflects modern Indonesian spelling although the general approach in Indonesia is to rely on the spelling preferred by the person concerned. At the time of his birth, the standard transcription was "Soeharto" and he preferred the original spelling. The international English-language press generally uses the spelling 'Suharto' while the Indonesian government and media use 'Soeharto'.

Suharto's upbringing contrasts with that of leading Indonesian nationalists such as Sukarno in that he is believed to have had little interest in anti-colonialism, or political concerns beyond his immediate surroundings. Unlike Sukarno and his circle, Suharto had little to no contact with European colonizers. Consequently, he did not learn to speak Dutch or other European languages in his youth. He learned to speak Dutch after his induction into the Dutch military in 1940.

== Military career ==
=== World War II and Japanese occupation ===
Suharto finished middle school at the age of 18 and took a clerical job at a bank in Wuryantaro. He was forced to resign after a bicycle mishap tore his only working clothes. Following a spell of unemployment, he joined the Royal Netherlands East Indies Army (KNIL) in June 1940, and undertook basic training in Gombong near Yogyakarta. With the Netherlands under German occupation and the Japanese pressing for access to Indonesian oil supplies, the Dutch had opened up the KNIL to large intakes of previously excluded Javanese. Suharto was assigned to Battalion XIII at Rampal, graduated from short training at KNIL Kaderschool in Gombong to become sergeant, and was posted to KNIL reserve battalion in Cisarua.

Following the Dutch surrender to the invading Japanese forces in March 1942, Suharto abandoned his KNIL uniform and went back to Wurjantoro. After months of unemployment, he then became one of thousands of Indonesians who took the opportunity to join Japanese-organised security forces by joining the Yogyakarta police force. In October 1943, Suharto was transferred from the police force to the newly formed Japanese-sponsored militia, the Pembela Tanah Air (PETA; Defenders of the Fatherland) in which Indonesians served as officers. In his training to serve at the rank of shodancho (platoon commander) he encountered a localised version of the Japanese bushido, or "way of the warrior", used to indoctrinate troops. This training encouraged an anti-Dutch and pro-nationalist thought, although toward the aims of the Imperial Japanese militarists. The encounter with a nationalistic and militarist ideology is believed to have profoundly influenced Suharto's own way of thinking.

Suharto was posted at a PETA coastal defence battalion at Wates, south of Yogyakarta, until he was admitted for training for company commander (chudancho) in Bogor from April to August 1944. As company commander, he conducted training for new PETA recruits in Surakarta, Jakarta, and Madiun. The Japanese surrender and Proclamation of Indonesian Independence in August 1945 occurred when Suharto was posted at remote Brebeg area (on the slopes of Mount Wilis) to train new NCOs to replace those executed by the Japanese in the aftermath of failed PETA rebellion of February 1945 in Blitar, led by Supriyadi.

=== Indonesian National Revolution ===
Two days after the Japanese surrender in the Pacific, independence leaders Sukarno and Hatta declared Indonesian independence, and were appointed president and vice-President respectively of the new Republic. Suharto disbanded his regiment in accordance with orders from the Japanese command and returned to Yogyakarta. As republican groups rose to assert Indonesian independence, Suharto helped to establish a fighting unit together with a former PETA colleague, Umar Slamet. This unit was amalgamated into the newly formed Indonesian armed forces (Tentara Keamanan Rakjat / TKR) which was established on 5 October 1945. His leadership skills in leading several attacks against Japanese soldiers in Yogyakarta area to seize their weapons led to Suharto's promotion to major. He was given command of newly formed Battalion X of Regiment I, which was in turn part of Division IX led by Colonel Sudarsono. By October 1945, this division has secured full control of Yogyakarta area by forcing the surrender of remaining Japanese soldiers.

The arrival of the Allies, under a mandate to return the situation to the status quo ante bellum, quickly led to clashes between Indonesian republicans and Allied forces, namely returning Dutch and assisting British forces. Suharto led his Battalion X when it was sent northwards to repel the British advance towards Yogyakarta from British-occupied port of Semarang. In a series of battles at Magelang and Ambarawa lasting from late-October to December 1945, Republican forces forced the British regroup at the confines of Semarang. Suharto's battle performance attracted attention of Sudirman, the Republican armed forces commander, who promoted him to lead newly formed Regiment III of Division IX (2,250 men) with rank of lieutenant-colonel on early 1946. In May 1946, Suharto's umbrella Division IX was amalgamated into new Division III under leadership of newly promoted Major-General Sudarsono. On 17 May 1946, the British handed-over control of Semarang to the Dutch T ("Tijger") Brigade. Suharto participated in a battle at Kendal where Division III successfully halted a southward advance by the Dutch brigade. As evidence of Suharto's increasing stature, in June 1946 Lieutenant-Colonel Sunarto Kusumodirdjo invited him to draft the working guidelines for the Battle Leadership Headquarters (MPP), a body created to organise and unify the command structure of the Indonesian nationalist forces.

The transfer of Republican capital from Jakarta to Yogyakarta in January 1946 exposed the armed units there to civilian political intrigue, most notably the "3 July Affair". Sukarno government's decision to commence negotiations with the Dutch caused much opposition from various Indonesian factions, which coalesced into a group called PP (Persatoean Perdjoangan) led by communist politician Tan Malaka. PP's opposition to negotiation with the Dutch received sympathy from many sections of the armed forces, including its commander Sudirman and Suharto's direct superior Major-General Sudarsono. On 27 June 1946, Sudarsono ordered the kidnapping of Prime Minister Sutan Sjahrir who was leading the negotiations with the Dutch. When Sukarno issued order for Sudarsono's arrest, the plot leader took refuge in Suharto's regimental headquarters at the outskirts of Yogyakarta, bringing the kidnapped Sjahrir with him. Suharto, while providing protection to his superior Sudarsono, was also secretly in contact with Sudirman to find-out whether the commander decided to support Sudarsono's kidnapping plot. When Sudirman indicated that Sukarno has convinced him not to support Sudarsono, Suharto helped loyal government forces to arrest Sudarsono and release the kidnapped Sjahrir on 3 July 1946, hence protecting himself from the subsequent purge of Division III in the aftermath of the affair.

The 3 July Affair led to further restructuring of Division III. By August 1946, Suharto was head of Yogyakarta-based 22nd Regiment, one of the six regiments of Division III (now named the "Diponegoro Division") which is responsible for the Central Java area. According to Dutch intelligence reports, by mid-1947, Suharto's regiment consisted of four battalions who were regularly rotated northwards to the frontlines surrounding Semarang to help contain the Dutch forces there. Dutch intelligence reported that Suharto was assisting smuggling syndicates in the transport of opium through the territory he controlled with the help of Chinese-Indonesian merchant Liem Sioe Liong to be bartered with weapons, clothes, food, and other supplies.

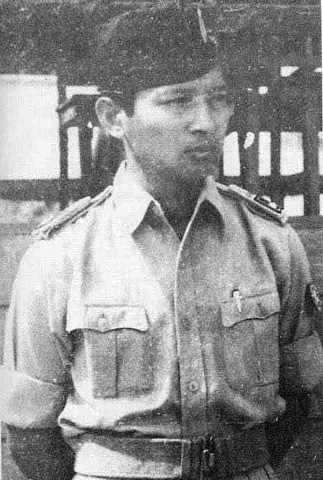
Lieutenant Colonel Suharto in 1947

On 21 July 1947, the Dutch launched Operatie Product, a military invasion into Republican-held areas. In Central Java, the Dutch T-Brigade pushed the Republican forces from Semarang to Magelang before a United Nations-brokered ceasefire was announced on 4 August. Suharto led his troops in the defence against this assault, and later was regularly rotated as frontline commander responsible for guarding the ceasefire line (Van Mook Line) north of Yogyakarta.

On 26 December 1947, Suharto married Siti Hartinah (known as Madam Tien), the daughter of a minor noble in the Mangkunegaran royal house of Solo. The arranged marriage was enduring and supportive, lasting until Tien's death in 1996. The couple had six children: Siti Hardiyanti Rukmana (Tutut, born 1949), Sigit Harjojudanto (born 1951), Bambang Trihatmodjo (born 1953), Siti Hediati (Titiek, born 1959), Hutomo Mandala Putra (Tommy, born 1962), and Siti Hutami Endang Adiningish (Mamiek, born 1964).

The signing of highly disadvantageous Renville Agreement in January 1948 resulted in evacuation of 35,000 Republican fighters from the Dutch-occupied side of the ceasefire line into the shrunk Republican-controlled territory. To control the unwieldy myriad of armed groups proliferating the Republican areas, Prime Minister Mohammad Hatta undertook rationalisation of the armed forces. In April 1948, Division III ("Diponegoro Division") was reduced from 16,000 to 7,000 men. Suharto was reshuffled as commander of Brigade III of the Division III, commanding four battalions. The unpopular rationalisation policies met often bloody resistance from many factions of the Republican forces, which again coalesced around the Indonesian Communist Party (PKI) under the leadership of Musso who recently returned from the Soviet Union. On late-September 1948, PKI-linked armed units seized control of Madiun in East Java and declared a "Soviet Republic of Indonesia" in opposition of Sukarno and Hatta. On 22 September, Republican commander Sudirman sent Suharto to communist-occupied Madiun to meet Musso in an unsuccessful attempt to reach a peaceful reconciliation. On 30 September, loyal troops launched assault on Madiun, which resulted in the killing of Musso and total defeat of the rebels by end-October 1948. Suharto's brigade participated in anti-communist operations in the areas east of Yogyakarta.

On 19 December 1948, to take advantage of the Republic's weak situation following the communist rebellion, the Dutch launched Operatie Kraai, designed to destroy the Republic once and for all. This invasion, initiated with an airborne assault on Yogyakarta, resulted in the capture of Sukarno, Hatta, and other Republican civilian leaders. Meanwhile, the Republican army was forced into the countryside to wage guerrilla resistance inline with Sudirman's Wehrkreise strategy.

Suharto, leaving his pregnant wife behind in Dutch-occupied Yogyakarta, led guerrilla operations from the rural areas south of the city. On 28 December 1948, Division III commander Colonel Bambang Soegeng divided Central Java into three defence areas ("Wehrkreise"). Suharto was appointed to command Wehrkreise III, consisting of two battalions operating in the areas surrounding Yogyakarta, with its headquarters at the Menorah hills in Bantul area. From January to February 1949, the Dutch T-Brigade incurred losses of 44 dead and 129 wounded from guerrilla attacks in areas under Suharto's control.

In dawn raids on 1 March 1949, Suharto's forces and local militia re-captured large parts of Yogyakarta city, holding it until noon. Suharto's later accounts had him as the lone plotter, although other sources say Sultan Hamengkubuwono IX of Yogyakarta and the Division III commander ordered the attack. However, General Nasution said that Suharto took great care in preparing the "General Offensive" (Indonesian Serangan Umum). The attack proved that the Dutch was very far from winning the guerrilla war. International opinion condemned the Dutch violation over internationally brokered Renville Agreement, with the United States and United Nations Security Council pressured the Dutch to cease the military offensive and to re-commence negotiations. These pressures resulted in Roem–Van Roijen Agreement of 7 May 1949, whereby the Dutch agreed to release captured Republican leaders and return area surrounding Yogyakarta to Republican control in exchange of ceasefire. Suharto was responsible for the take-over of Yogyakarta city from the withdrawing Dutch forces on 29 June 1949. On 9 July 1949, Suharto led the welcoming parade for recently released Republican leaders (including Sukarno and Hatta) to Yogyakarta while the following day he led similar parade for tuberculosis-ridden Sudirman back into the city from his rural guerrilla base. On 27 December 1949, the Dutch surrendered sovereignty to the United States of Indonesia.

=== Post-Independence military career ===
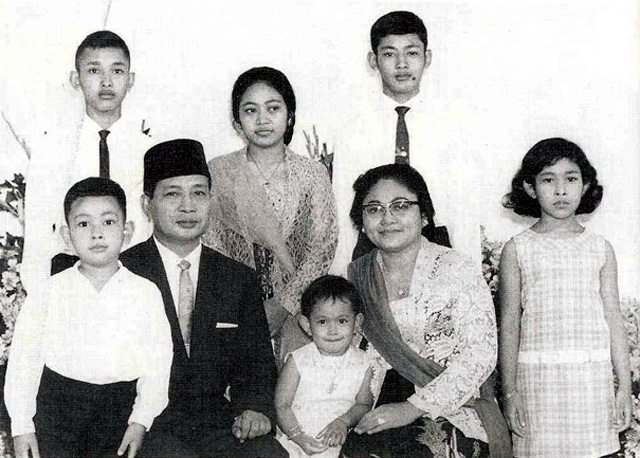
Suharto with his wife and six children in 1967

By 1950, Suharto served as commander of Brigade X ("Garuda Mataram Brigade") of Diponegoro Division, consisting of four battalions of around 800 men each. In April 1950, Suharto led this brigade to Makassar as part of expeditionary force to suppress a rebellion of former KNIL supporters of the Dutch-established State of East Indonesia led by Andi Azis (Makassar Uprising). During his stay in Makassar, Suharto became acquainted with his neighbours the Habibie family, whose eldest son B. J. Habibie would later become Suharto's vice-president and went on to succeed him as president. Suharto's brigade later engaged in the difficult mission of disarming and integrating both former KNIL soldiers and former pro-Republican guerillas into the army. His brigade defeated an unruly former guerrilla unit under Arief Rate (who was killed) and hostile former KNIL soldiers in heavy urban combat in Makassar city centre during June 1950, losing seventeen men killed in action. Suharto and his brigade returned to Central Java in September 1950 with the successful dissolution of State of East Indonesia into newly formed Unitary Republic of Indonesia.

In November 1951, Suharto was appointed to lead enlarged Pragola Brigade (consisting of nine battalions) based in Salatiga. In December 1951, one of Suharto's battalions (Battalion 426) which consisted of former Islamic militias, rebelled in support of ongoing Darul Islam insurgency in West Java. From late-December 1951 to late-January 1952, Suharto led "Operasi Merdeka Timur V" which successfully defeated the rebellious battalion in vicious fighting in Klaten area. Remnants of Battalion 426 joined Darul Islam insurgents operating in northwestern part of Central Java which were only defeated in 1957.

In March 1953, Suharto was appointed commander of Infantry Regiment III consisting of four battalions (3,704 men) based in Surakarta, organizing its participation in battling Darul Islam insurgents in northwestern Central Java and anti-bandit operations in Mount Merapi area. He also sought to stem pervasive leftist sympathies amongst his troops (one of his leftist-leaning subordinates in this period was Untung bin Sjamsuri who would later lead the 30 September Movement in 1965). His experience in this period left Suharto with deep distaste for both Islamic and communist radicalism which he believed could be countered only with material and financial sufficiency on the part of the people.

On 3 September 1956 Suharto was promoted to command the Diponegoro Division with the rank of colonel, based in Semarang and responsible for Central Java and Yogyakarta provinces. Upon a series of anti-Jakarta "regional coups" by military commanders in Sumatera and Sulawesi islands, and the subsequent declaration of martial law (Staat van Oorlog en Beleg) by President Sukarno in March 1957, Suharto became regional martial law administrator for the two provinces. With wide-ranging power over civilian affairs in his hands, Suharto began organizing various fund-raising activities to finance his poorly paid troops under the coordination of the division's "finance and economic office". Developing on the fund-raising tactics he used during the revolutionary war, Suharto established charitable organizations ("jajasan") which would receive "donations" from all enterprises operating in the provinces as well as levying "unofficial tax" on provision of goods and services. With the aid of ethnic-Chinese businessmen such as Bob Hasan, Suharto organized bartering of sugar and copra to Singapore in exchange with much-needed food supplies. By 1959, Suharto's jajasans had acquired capital of Rp 75,750,800 (equivalent to 1959 US$1,683,351 and a current value of US$13.3 million).

The defeat of the PRRI-Permesta rebellions (in which Suharto's divisional soldiers were heavily involved) was followed by President Sukarno's decree of 5 July 1959 concentrating power at the president. As part of re-assertion of central government control, army chief General Abdul Haris Nasution launched a nationwide crackdown on regional military corruption, including Suharto's commercial activities in Central Java. In July 1959, Nasution sent army internal audit chief Brigadier-General Sungkono to audit financial dealings of Diponegoro Division. The investigation found that while some of the proceeds from Suharto's jajasans were used for charitable purposes, most of the money raised could not be accounted for responsibly. On 1 November 1959, Suharto was removed from his divisional command and on the advice of Lieutenant General Gatot Subroto he was ordered to attend army staff and command training (SSKAD, now SESKOAD) in Bandung.

Despite this setback, Suharto's past services and strong backers meant that his future career remained undisturbed. While in Bandung he was promoted to brigadier-general in January 1960. Suharto graduated from SSKAD in December 1960 with a thesis on greater military role in political, economic, and social development of Indonesia. He was then appointed as operational deputy to army chief-of-staff based in Jakarta. In March 1961, he was given an additional command, as head of the army's new general reserve force called Tjadangan Umum Angkatan Darat / TJADUAD (later renamed Komando Strategis Angkatan Darat / KOSTRAD), a ready-reaction air-mobile force. Additionally, he was appointed to lead the new army air-defence command (Komando Pertahanan Udara Angkatan Darat / KOHANUDAD) in October 1961.

On 9 January 1962, Suharto was promoted to the rank of major-general and appointed to lead Mandala Command, a joint army-navy-air force command of 42,000 soldiers formed the organize the military aspect of the campaign to win Netherlands New Guinea (whom Indonesians referred to as "West Irian"), from the Dutch who were preparing it for independence outside of Indonesia, contrary to the provisions of Dutch-Indonesian Round Table Conference of 1949. His position as Mandala commander, based in Makassar, provided martial-law power over Sulawesi, Maluku Islands, and Lesser Sunda Islands covering 5 million square kilometres. Suharto organized infiltration of around 3,000 Indonesian soldiers into the disputed territory by air and sea, although these infiltrators were mostly dropped deep in the jungle with no effect on Dutch control over population centers. With massive Soviet armaments and even manpower aid, Suharto formulated a highly risky plan to invade and capture Dutch military headquarters in Biak using 25,000 soldiers in an airborne and amphibious operation code-named Operasi Djajawidjaja set for 15 August 1962. However, Suharto received orders to abort the operation while he was already in-place at advanced headquarters in Peleng island, off Sulawesi. On 15 August, under heavy American pressure, the Dutch signed the New York Agreement whereby control over West Irian was relinquished to UNTEA (United National Temporary Executive Authority) in October 1962. On 1 May 1963, UNTEA handed-control of the territory to Indonesia. On that day, Suharto led a "victory parade" of Indonesian soldiers in front of President Sukarno at West Irian's capital Sukarnapura (formerly Hollandia, now Jayapura).

After the disbandment of Mandala Command in May 1963, Suharto returned to Jakarta to his post as KOSTRAD (formerly TJADUAD) commander. As evidence of his seniority, he was appointed as deputy head of army advisory board on senior-level promotions (WANDJAKTI) in July 1963. Again showing his penchant for commercial dealings, Suharto used his KOSTRAD command to establish several jajasans which ostensibly functioned to raise funds to cover KOSTRAD's operational needs. In April 1964, Suharto established Jajasan Darma Putra, which over-time acquired shares in raft of businesses from transportation, banking, and manufacturing sectors (such as Mandala Airlines and Bank Windu Kentjana).

During this period, Sukarno gradually shifted the country to the left by promoting the growth of Indonesian Communist Party (PKI) in order to counter the power of the military within his Guided Democracy system. In May 1964, Sukarno declared military confrontation against newly formed Malaysia, with the stated objective of establishing "State of North Kalimantan" under leadership of North Kalimantan Communist Party. To organize the military aspect of this confrontation, Sukarno formed the Vigilance Command (Komando Siaga / KOGA) commanded by air force commander Omar Dhani. In October 1964, KOGA was transformed into Vigilance Mandala Command (Komando Mandala Siaga / KOLAGA) with wide-ranging martial law powers over the islands of Sumatera and Kalimantan which borders Malaysia. Dhani remained as KOLAGA commander, while Suharto was appointed as KOLAGA first deputy with authority over operational affairs. KOLAGA organized infiltration of Indonesian soldiers and volunteers (as well as Malaysian communists) into Malaysia where they engaged in jungle warfare with British and Commonwealth soldiers deployed to protect the nascent Malaysia.

While publicly supportive of Sukarno's confrontation policy, the army leadership was very reluctant to commit to the military confrontation against Malaysia, which they considered to benefit only the PKI at expense of the military. Additionally, the army was slighted by appointment of airforce commander Dhani, a known communist sympathiser, as KOLAGA commander. Army chief Lieutenant-General Ahmad Yani and Suharto ensured that the best-prepared troops and vital supplies remained in Java to ensure no escalation of the conflict. This strategy was supported by army commander in North Sumatera, Colonel Kemal Idris, who was an avowed anti-communist. However, the army commander in Kalimantan, Brigadier-General Mustafa Sjarif Supardjo, was a committed communist sympathiser who strongly resented the army headquarters' barely disguised sabotage policy. He would later become a key participant in the 30 September Movement against top army leadership. Unlike Yani who barely disguised his disapproval of confrontation policy, Suharto managed to maintain his public appearance as enthusiastic supporter of Sukarno's anti-Malaysian policies.

In August 1964, Suharto authorised KOSTRAD's intelligence officer, Lieutenant-Colonel Ali Murtopo, to send several officers (including future Armed Forces chief Leonardus Benjamin Moerdani) to spread secret peace-feelers to the Malaysian government. Suharto's position in KOLAGA also provided him with more sinister commercial opportunity in organizing the smuggling of rubber, timber, and other primary products from North Sumatera to Malaysia using ethnic-Chinese fishermen.
