= Mercu Buana University =

- Type: Private
- Established: October 22, 1985
- Rector: Dr. Harwikarya, MT (Caretaker rector pending the result of rector election)
- Location: Jakarta, Indonesia
- Campus: Jakarta: Meruya; Menteng; Warung Buncit
- Colors: Coquelicot, blue and white
- Website: mercubuana.ac.id

Mercu Buana University (UMB, or Universitas Mercu Buana) is a private university is a private university under the Menara Bhakti Foundation located in Jakarta, Indonesia.

== History ==
With his background as a teacher at Taman Siswa, Pematang Siantar, North Sumatra, H. Probosutedjo established Akademi Wiraswasta Dewantara (Dewantara Entrepreneur Academy; AWD) on November 10, 1981. Its groundbreaking was conducted by H. Adam Malik, former Indonesian vice president. The name was taken from a national education figure: Ki Hajar Dewantara.

Before it had its own campus, lectures were given at Gedung Yayasan Tenaga Kerja Indonesia (the Building of Indonesian Migrant Workers’s Foundation – YTKI) on Jalan Gatot Soebroto. In 1984, Yayasan Menara Bhakti (Menara Bhakti Foundation) built the Menara Bhakti Campus.

In 1985, plans were made to erect a university-level institution. With a decree of the chairman of Menara Bhakti Foundation, they in 1985 formed a committee to establish a university. On the committee were chairman Dr. Sri-Edi Swasono assisted by H. Abdul Madjid, Dr. Iman Santosa Sukardi, Dr. M. Enoch Markum, Ir. Suharyadi, M.S., Soekarno and Prijo S. Parwoto.

Kopertis Region III (Responsible for Jadetabek region) granted an operational permit to Mercu Buana University. On October 22, 1985 Mercu Buana was officially declared as a university with faculties and departments as follows:

- Faculty of Engineering, with Architecture and Civil Engineering Departments
- Faculty of Agriculture, with Agribusiness and Agronomy Departments
- Economics, with Management and Accounting Departments

The number of students in the first year was 118. A year later, based upon assessment result conducted by Kopertis Region III, the six departments received “Registered” status from Minister of Education and Culture.

== Organization and Governance ==
=== Rector ===
Dr. Harwikarya, MT is the caretaker rector of Mercu Buana University, pending the official result of rector selection.

=== Schools and colleges ===
UMB is organized into schools and colleges, each with a different dean and organization.

==== Faculties ====
- Mercu Buana College of Accounting
- Mercu Buana College of Enterprise Management
- Mercu Buana Faculty of Accounting
- Mercu Buana Faculty of Communication Studies
- Mercu Buana Faculty of Management
- Mercu Buana Faculty of Computer Science
- Mercu Buana Faculty of Architectural Engineering
- Mercu Buana Faculty of Industrial Engineering
- Mercu Buana Faculty of Electrochemical Technology
- Mercu Buana Faculty of Psychology

==== Postgraduate schools ====
- Mercu Buana School of Communication Studies
- Mercu Buana School of Management
- Mercu Buana School of Industrial Engineering
- Mercu Buana School of Telecommunication Engineering
- Mercu Buana School of Accounting

== Rankings ==
Internationally, Mercu Buana University has been named Number One Private Higher Education based on the AD Index Scientific Ranking in 2022 and ranked 3rd Best Private University in DKI Jakarta from uniRank.org in 2022. Domestically, Mercu Buana University occupies the position of eleven nationally and number three in Jakarta based on the 2022 Webometric ranking. Meanwhile, according to the 2020 Indonesian Higher Education Clusterization by the Directorate General of Higher Education, Ministry of Education, Culture, Research and Technology of the Republic of Indonesia, Mercu Buana University is ranked 33 nationally (4 best private LLDIKTI Region 3 Jakarta).

== Facilities ==
Campuses

- Menara Bhakti Campus is on Jalan Meruya Selatan, Kebun Jeruk, West Jakarta.
- Menteng Campus is in Tedja Buana Building (Kedaung) 4th–6th floors on Jalan Menteng Raya No. 29, Central Jakarta.
- Warung Buncit A.K.A Pejaten Campus is on Jalan Warung Buncit Raya No. 98, South Jakarta.
