= Jogja Disability Arts =

- Abbreviation: JDA
- Established: 2020
- Founder: Sukri Dharma
- Founded at: Yogyakarta, Indonesia
- Type: Nonprofit visual arts collective
- Purpose: Disability inclusion in the Indonesian arts world
- Website: jda.or.id

Jogja Disability Arts is a nonprofit art collective based in Jogjakarta, Indonesia. It was established in 2020 and to create opportunities for people with disabilities in the field of arts and culture nationally and internationally. JDA aims to create more meaningful participation for artists with disabilities in Indonesia as part of the larger art ecosystem in Indonesia. They are located in the second floor of the RJ Katamsi Gallery at the Indonesia Institute of the Arts Yogyakarta (ISI Yogyakarta).

== History ==
Jogja Disability Arts was started in 2009 by Sukri Budi Dharma (Butong). The idea to start this collective came to him when he went overseas with Disability Art Learning after being selected by the British Council. There, Butong saw that people of disability were given a platform for creative expression and sought to do the same in Yogyakarta. Besides Butong, there are many others in the leadership team of JDA, including Agus Yulianto and Theresia Agustina Sitompul.

== Programming ==
Jogja Disability arts have created many programming and workshops for people with disability since its inception in 2020. As an example, in 2021 JDA put together Jogja International Disability Arts Biennale. This inaugural Biennale featured 95 artworks by artists from Indonesia, Korea, US, UK, Australia, Philippines and South Africa. In commemoration of International Day of Disabilities in 2022, Jogja Disability Arts held an exhibition titled "Suluh Sumurup" at the RJ Katamsi Gallery. This event also involved many other community organizations in the field of fine arts and people with disabilities such as AndArt and Kembang Selatan. In 2022, JDA supported artists whose work were exhibited at the ARTJOG Festival. The theme for that year's festival was Expanding Awareness, and it featured 61 new and established artists and art collectives spanning generations. In 2023, Jogja Disability Arts held the second Jogja International Disability Arts Biennale. The exhibition, held on 13th until 21st October of 2023, featured 54 artists from twelve countries including Australia, Brazil, the UK and Nigeria. In 2024, Jogja Disability Arts and DaDaFest initiated PRISM, which is a two-country participatory research project on disability arts. Through PRISM, this project created workshops, seminars and exhibitions in a span of ten months. In 2024, JDA held the second Suluh Sumurup Art Festival which exhibited the results of Body Mapping events that were part of the PRISM project. In 2025, JDA held the third Suluh Sumurup Art Festival. It was held in Taman Budaya Yogyakarta and had the theme "Jéjér". JDA also created another event, Disability Arts Festival 2025, this time in Jakarta. Held at Epiwalk Lifestyle Epicentrum, in Kuningan, Jakarta Selatan, the event was inaugurated by Mohammad O. Royani, the Director of Social Rehabilitation for Persons with Disabilities, Ministry of Social Affairs.
