= Danarto =

Indonesian writer and artist

- Born: 27 June 1941; Sragen, Central Java, Indonesia
- Died: 10 April 2018 (aged 76); Jakarta
- Resting place: Sragen
- Education: Indonesian Institute of the Arts, Yogyakarta
- Occupations: Artist, writer, painter, theater-director, stage-designer, poet
- Spouse: Siti Zainab Luxfiati (m. 1986; div. 2001)
- Children: -
- Writing career
- Pen name: Danarto
- Language: Indonesian
- Genres: Realism, Concrete poetry, Short story, Magic realism, Tasawwuf, Sufism
- Notable awards: Jakarta Arts Council Novel Competition, short story, "Adam Ma'rifat" (1982); Buku Utama Prize, Best Fiction, "Adam Ma'rifat" (1982); Buku Utama Prize, Best Fiction, "Berhala" (1987); S.E.A. Write Award (1988); Language Development and Fostering Agency, short story compilation, "Berhala" (1990); Kompas Lifetime Achievement Award (2008)

Danarto (27 June 1941 in Sragen, Central Java – 10 April 2018, Jakarta) was an Indonesian writer and artist. His father was Jakio Harjodinomo, a sugar factory foreman. His mother, named Siti Aminah, was small batik trader in the market. His work is well known; especially a collection of short stories: Godlob. Another collection of short stories, Adam Ma'rifat, won the Literature Prize of the Dewan Kesenian Jakarta (Jakarta Arts Council) in 1982. In 2009 Danarto accepted the Ahmad Bakrie Award for literature.

== Life ==
After completing his education at the elementary school (SD) and junior high school (SMP), he continued his schooling in literature at the secondary school (SMA) in Solo. In 1958–1961 he studied at the Indonesian Institute of the Arts, Yogyakarta (ASRI) majoring in art. During this period, he also edited the children's magazine, Si Kuncung. Until 1964, he was a member of the art and drama group "Sanggarbambu" (Bamboo Monastery). In 1969–1974 he worked at the arts center Jakarta (Taman Ismail Marzuki). In 1973 he became a lecturer at the Academy of Fine Arts LPKJ (now IKJ) Jakarta. He was the chief designer for the Indonesian cultural group that visited Osaka, Japan, for Expo '70. During 1978, he toured Europe and Asia with a theatrical troupe, led by the choreographer and director Sardono, acting and designing sets. In 1988, he received the S.E.A. Write Award. In later years, he has worked as a theatrical director in Jakarta. He died on 10 April 2018 at the age of 76.

== Publications ==
- Danarto (1975). Godlob (9 short stories) (in Indonesian). jakarta: Rombongan "Dongeng dari Dirah. OCLC 3631519.
- Danarto (1978). Abracadabra (short stories) translated by Harry Aveling. Singapore: Heinemann Educational Books (Asia). LCCN 78942854. OL 4395296M.
- Danarto (1984). Orang Jawa naik haji (biography) (in Indonesian). jakarta: Grafiti Pers. OCLC 11354518.
- Danarto (1989). A Javanese pilgrim in Mecca (biography) translated by Harry Aveling. Australia: Clayton, Vic. ISBN 9780867469394. OCLC 21113995.
- Danarto (2001). Abracadabra (short stories) translated by Harry Aveling. Jakarta: Metafor Publications. ISBN 9793019026. LCCN 2001469328. OL 3542033M.
