= Sewon =

- Kapanewon
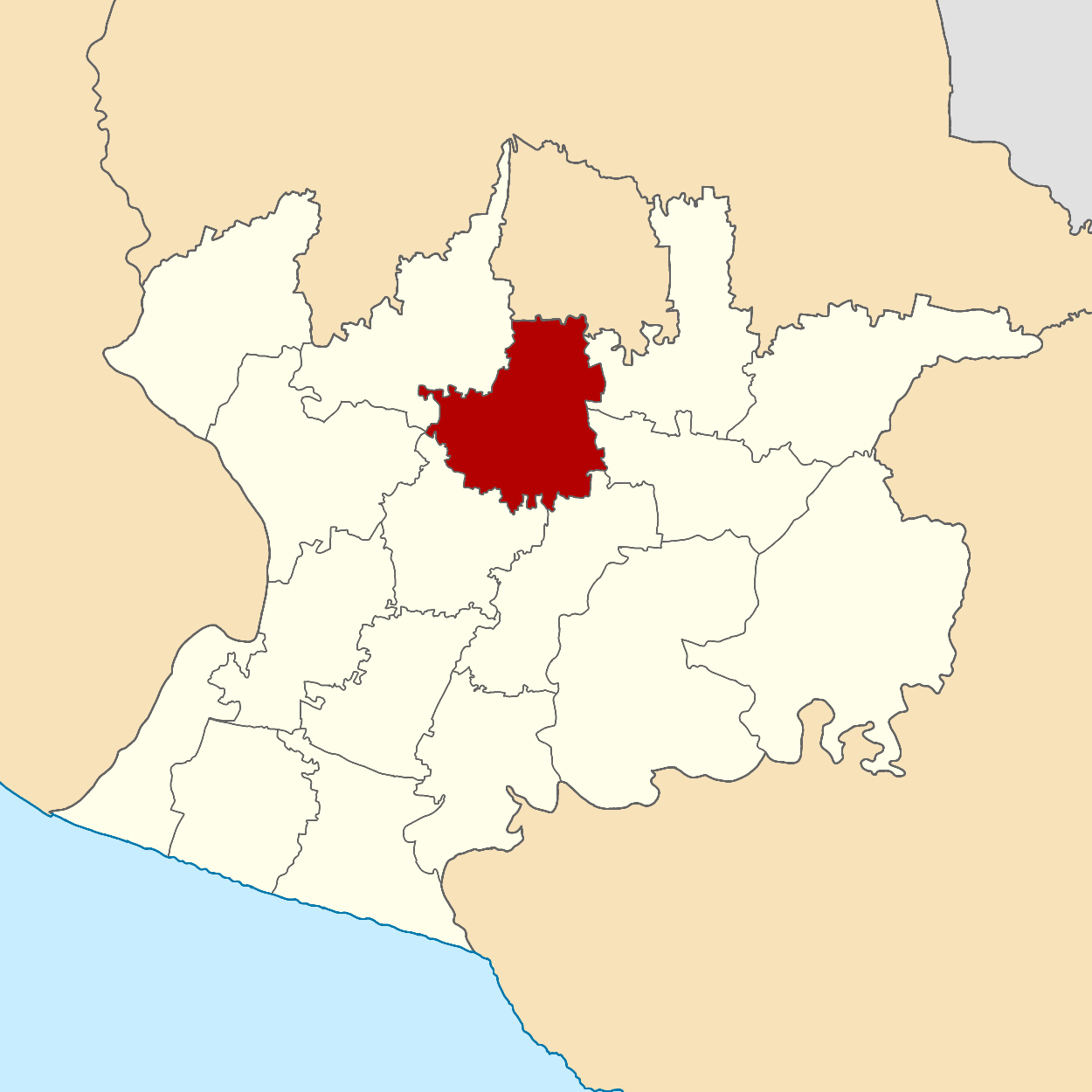
- Map of Bantul Regency with Sewon highlighted
- Country: Indonesia
- Province: Special Region of Yogyakarta
- Regency: Bantul

Area
  - Total: 27.16 km^{2} (10.49 sq mi)

Population (2023)
  - Total: 111,890
  - Density: 4,120/km^{2} (10,670/sq mi)
- Time zone: UTC+07:00 (IWST)
- Postal Code: 55185 - 55188

Sewon is an administrative district (kapanewon) in Bantul Regency, Special Region of Yogyakarta, Indonesia.
