= Susi Pudjiastuti =

Indonesian entrepreneur and politician

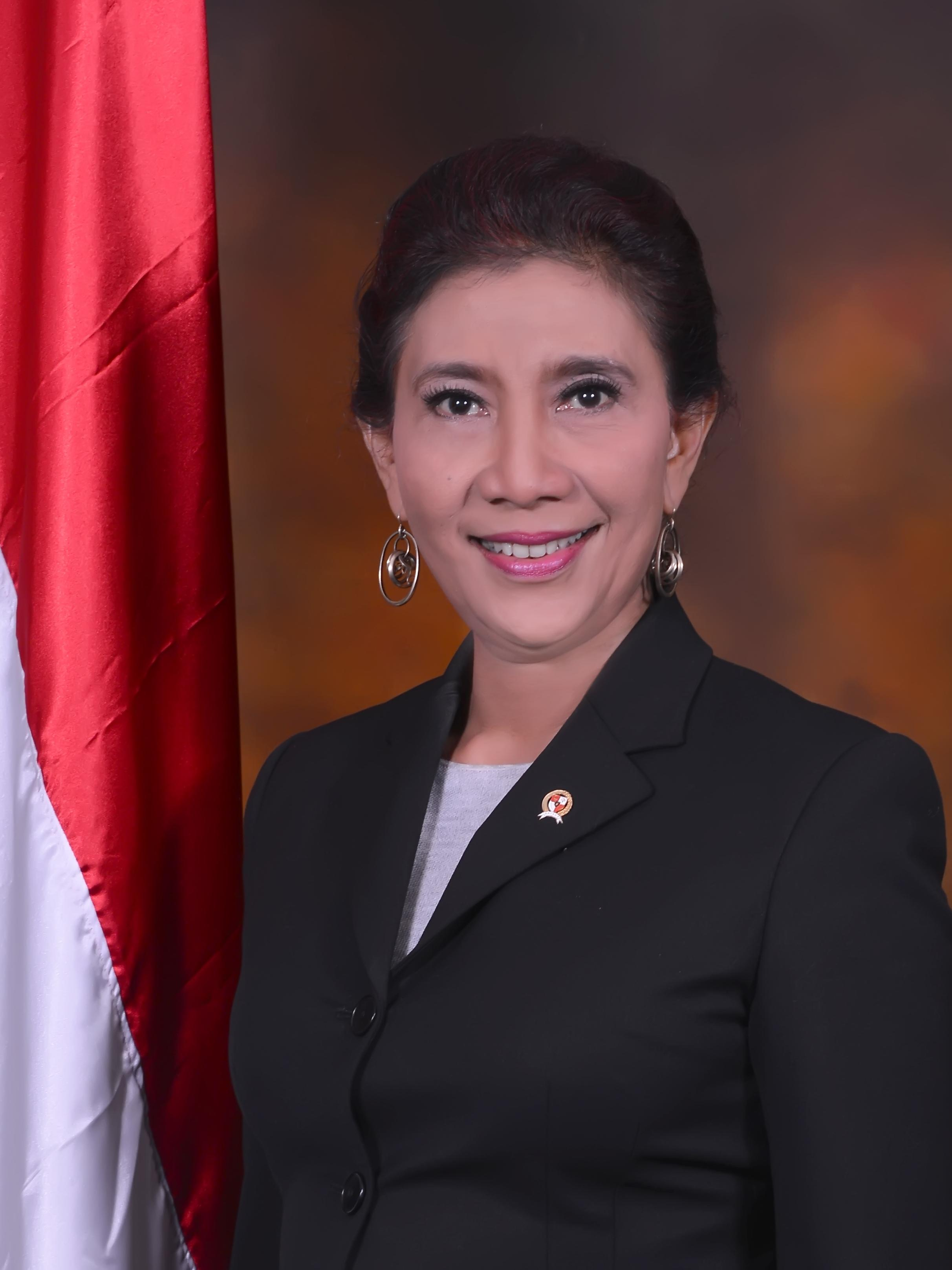
- Official portrait, 2014

7th Minister of Maritime Affairs and Fisheries of Indonesia
- In office 27 October 2014 – 20 October 2019
- President: Joko Widodo
- Preceded by: Sharif Cicip Sutarjo
- Succeeded by: Edhy Prabowo

Personal details
- Born: 15 January 1965 (age 61) Pangandaran, West Java, Indonesia
- Party: Independent
- Spouse(s): Yoyok Yudi Suharyo (m. 1983; div. 1986) Daniel Kaiser (m. 1992; div. 1999) Christian von Strombeck
- Children: 3
- Parent(s): Ahmad Karlan (father); Suwuh Lasminah (mother)
- Education: SMA Negeri 1 Yogyakarta
- Alma mater: Diponegoro University (Dr.h.c.)
- Profession: Bussinesswoman

Susi Pudjiastuti (born 15 January 1965) is an Indonesian entrepreneur who served as the Minister of Maritime Affairs and Fisheries of Indonesia under President Joko Widodo's 2014–2019 Working Cabinet. She is also the owner of PT ASI Pudjiastuti Marine Product, a seafood export company, and PT ASI Pudjiastuti Aviation, which operates Susi Air charter airline.

== Early life, family, and education ==
Pudjiastuti was born 15 January 1965, in Pangandaran, West Java, the daughter of Haji Ahmad Karlan and Hajjah Suwuh Lasminah (1918–2013). She is Javanese, but her family are fifth-generation settlers of Pangandaran, which is predominantly Sundanese. Her family business was engaged primarily in real estate and livestock farming.

Following junior high school, Pudjiastuti continued senior high school at SMA Negeri 1 Yogyakarta, but did not complete her studies after she was expelled for political activism promoting Golput (Golongan Putih, or blank ballot in protest of the Golkar Party's dominance making Indonesia a One-party state), a movement which was banned under then President Suharto's New Order. Pudjiastuti was the first Indonesian minister to have never completed a high school education, although after she became a government minister, she enrolled for a late high school programme (Paket C), and she officially graduated in 2018.

Pudjiastuti had three children; Panji Hilmansyah, Nadine Kaiser, and Alvy Xavier. Her first son, Panji Hilmansyah, died aged 31 on 18 January 2016 in Naples, Florida due to heart failure.

== Entrepreneurship and Susi Air ==
In 1983, Pudjiastuti embarked on a career as an entrepreneur, starting as a seafood distributor at a Fish Auction Facility (TPI) in Pangandaran. Her distributorship evolved into a seafood processing plant in 1996 named PT ASI Pudjiastuti Marine Product, which specialised in export-quality lobsters packaged as 'Susi Brand'. PT ASI Pudjiastuti Marine Product expanded, and began exporting its products to Asia and America.

The growing demand for PT ASI Pudjiastuti Marine Product's fresh seafood lead to rapid air transport as a necessity for the business. In 2004, Pudjiastuti acquired a Cessna 208 Caravan, and established PT ASI Pudjiastuti Aviation. The Cessna was given the call-sign 'Susi Air', and was used to transport fresh Indonesian seafood to Jakarta, as well as overseas to Singapore, Hong Kong, and Japan.

During the 2004 Indian Ocean earthquake and tsunami which devastated Aceh and the west coast of Sumatra, Susi Air, which at the time only consisted of two Cessna Grand Caravans, was one of the first responders which distributed food and supplies to victims in isolated areas of the disaster. During this period, Susi Air was routinely chartered in Aceh by non-governmental organisations (NGOs) for humanitarian relief missions. The revenues earned from the NGO Aceh missions enabled Susi Air to acquire new aeroplanes, and expand its fleet to routes in Papua and Kalimantan. Susi Air is now the largest operator of Cessna Grand Caravans in the Asia Pacific region

== Appointment as Minister of Marine Affairs and Fisheries ==
On 26 October 2014, President Joko Widodo appointed Pudjiastuti as Minister of Marine Affairs and Fisheries under his 2014–2019 working cabinet. Prior to accepting her appointment, Pudjiastuti relinquished her position as President Director of PT ASI Pudjiastuti Marine Product and PT ASI Pudjiastuti Aviation.

She inherited an agency in danger of being eliminated. Foreign fishing boats regularly encroached on Indonesian waters surrounding the archipelago's 17,500 islands. She impounded hundreds of foreign fishing boats, and had them destroyed. Since taking office, most of the 10,000 foreign fishing boats preying on Indonesia's biodiversity have quit Indonesian waters. From 2013 to 2017, fishing stocks have more than doubled during her watch. In April 2018, she ordered the interception and capture of the Andrey Dolgov, a notorious illegal fishing boat.

On 16 September 2016, the World Wide Fund for Nature (WWF) awarded her the Leaders for a Living Planet Award. This is in recognition of her efforts as Ministry of Marine Affairs and Fisheries in promoting sustainable development in the Indonesian fisheries sector and conservation of the marine ecosystem, as well as her fierce crackdown on illegal fishing in Indonesian waters.

According to a study published in the journal Nature Ecology & Evolution, Susi's aggressive anti-illegal fishing policies have "reduced total fishing effort by at least 25%, (...) [potentially] generate a 14% increase in catch and a 12% increase in profit."

== Awards and honours ==
- Leaders for Living Planet Award; by World Wide Fund for Nature (WWF). 2016
- Doctor Honoris Causa (Dr.h.c.) by Diponegoro University. 2016
- The BBC 100 Women. 2017
