= Edhy Prabowo =

Indonesian politician

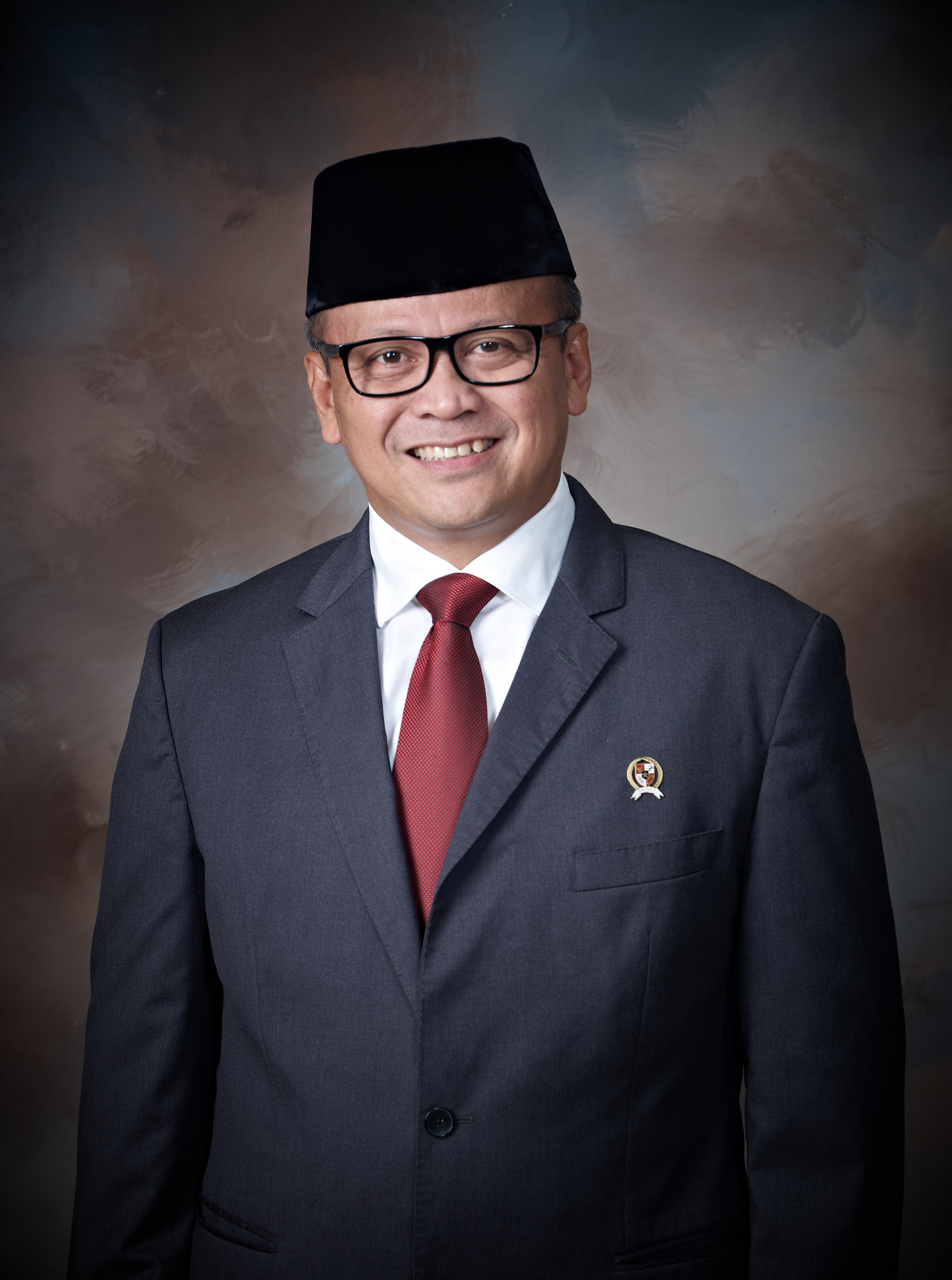

8th Minister of Maritime Affairs and Fisheries
- In office 23 October 2019 – 26 November 2020
- President: Joko Widodo
- Preceded by: Susi Pudjiastuti
- Succeeded by: Sakti Wahyu Trenggono

Member of the House of Representatives
- In office 1 October 2009 – 23 October 2019
- Constituency: South Sumatra I

Personal details
- Born: 24 December 1972 (age 52); Muara Enim, South Sumatra, Indonesia
- Political party: Gerindra (2008–2020)
- Education: University of Prof. Dr. Moestopo; Swiss German University

Edhy Prabowo (born 24 December 1972) is an Indonesian politician from the Great Indonesia Movement Party (Gerindra). He served as Minister of Maritime Affairs and Fisheries from October 2019 until his arrest for alleged corruption in November 2020. He has served as Chairperson of Commission IV of the House of Representatives and was chair of the Gerindra Faction there from 2014–2019.

== Background ==
Edhy joined the Indonesian military in 1991 but was expelled after only 2 years. After this, he relocated to Jakarta and ended up becoming acquainted with future Indonesian presidential candidate Prabowo Subianto. The men became close, and Subianto paid for Edhy to get a degree in education as well as to study martial arts (silat). Edhy Prabowo's public profile during the 1990s was mostly linked to his career as a martial arts athlete.

He graduated with a degree from the Economics department at the University of Prof. Dr. Moestopo in Jakarta in 1997. He accompanied Subianto abroad when he was stationed in Germany and Jordan and followed him into politics when he founded the Gerindra party. Later he continued his education and got a master's degree in management from Swiss German University in Tangerang in 2004.

== Career ==
Edhy began his political career in 2005 by joining the Indonesian Farmers Association (HKTI), becoming the chair of its Education and Training Division by 2007. Also in 2007, Edhy founded a security services company, PT Garuda Security Nusantara, where he served as president director. In the same year, he became a commissioner of PT Kiani Lestari Jakarta, a paper company owned by his patron, Prabowo Subianto.

After Prabowo Subianto founded Gerindra Party in 2008, Edhy ran as a candidate for the party and was elected to the House of Representatives for the 2009–2014 term, representing the South Sumatra I electoral district. He was re-elected for the 2014–2019 term, during which he headed the House's Commission IV. Edhy was re-elected for the 2019–2024 term, though after Prabowo Subianto failed to win the presidency in 2019, Indonesian President Joko Widodo included some Gerindra members in his cabinet including Prabowo Subianto and Edhy, who was appointed Minister of Maritime Affairs and Fisheries on 23 October 2019.

== Corruption Case ==
Edhy was arrested on 25 November 2020 by the Corruption Eradication Commission for allegedly receiving bribes in connection with the awarding of export licenses for lobster larvae. His wife and 7 other people was also arrested in connection with the case. A day after his arrest, Edhy resigned from his ministerial position, and his post from Gerindra.

On 15 July 2021 Edhy was sentenced to five years in prison, he was also fined IDR 400 million and obligated to pay IDR9,8 billion and also 77.000 USD in compensation. The punishment was revised in November 2021 where he was sentenced to nine years in prison.

On 7 March 2022 Edhy's appeal was granted and his punishment was reduced to 5 years in prison and IDR 400 million in fines.

It was later found that Gazalba Saleh, one of the judges that was involved in reducing Edhy's punishment, was arrested for accepting bribes in the case of Budiman Gandi Suparman.
