= Sakti Wahyu Trenggono =

Indonesian politician (born 1962)

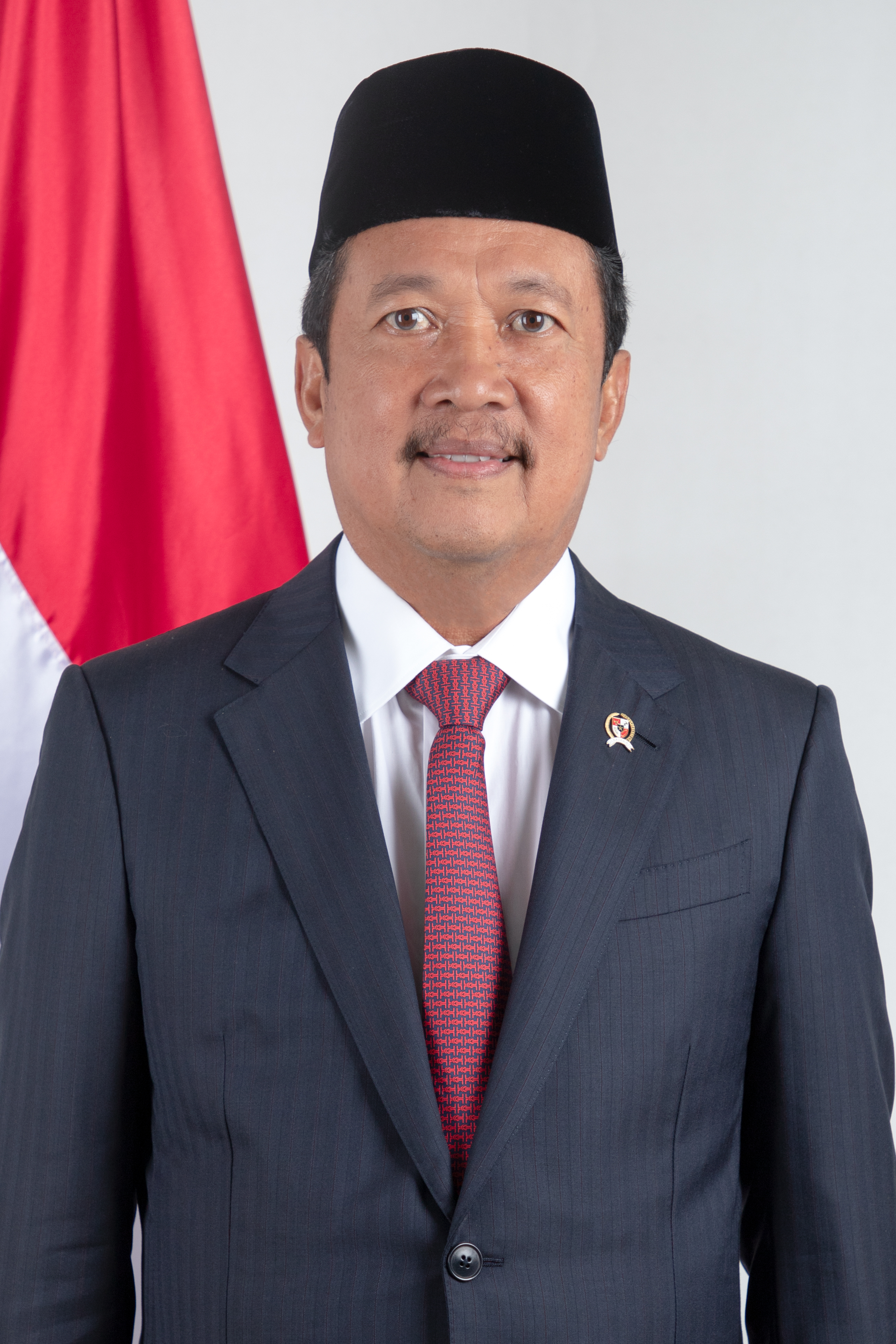

9th Minister of Maritime Affairs and Fisheries
- Incumbent
- Assumed office 23 December 2020
- President: Joko Widodo; Prabowo Subianto
- Deputy: Didit Herdiawan
- Preceded by: Edhy Prabowo; Luhut Binsar Pandjaitan; Syahrul Yasin Limpo (interim)

8th Deputy Minister of Defense
- In office 25 October 2019 – 23 December 2020
- President: Joko Widodo
- Minister: Prabowo Subianto
- Preceded by: Sjafrie Sjamsoeddin
- Succeeded by: Muhammad Herindra

Personal details
- Born: 3 November 1962 (age 63) Semarang, Central Java, Indonesia
- Party: PAN (2009–2013, since 2024); Independent (2013-2024)
- Spouse: Ernawati
- Education: Bandung Institute of Technology (Ir.); BINUS University (M.M)

Sakti Wahyu Trenggono (born 3 November 1962) is an Indonesian politician. As of 23 December 2020, he serves as Minister of Maritime Affairs and Fisheries in the Onward Indonesia Cabinet of President Joko Widodo.

== Early life and education ==
Trenggono was graduated from Industrial Engineering Department of Bandung Institute of Technology in 1986 and Informatics Management Department of Bina Nusantara College of Informatics and Computer Management (now BINUS University) in 1988. He later graduated from Management Program of Bandung Institute of Technology and obtained his master's degree in 2006. In 2021, he enrolled to Public Policies Program of Bandung Institute of Technology for another master's degree and doctoral degree.

== Business Careers ==
He started his career as programmer and system analyst of Federal Motor (now Astra Honda Motor) from 1986 to 1992. From his experiences as programmer and system analyst, he later transferred to Astra Group HQ as Manager of Management Information System, Business Development, and Supply Chain of the company from 1995 to 1997.

He later moved to PT. Solusindo Kreasi Pratama, a private telecommunication infrastructure developer and provider company. Here, he worked his way until finally reached the position of General Director of this company. He held his post from 2000 to 2009. Later in 2010, he moved to PT. Teknologi Riset Global Investama, an Indonesian cloud computing provider company and private telecommunication research company as General Commissioner until 2016.

During his time in telecommunication industry, he became Head of Indonesian Association of Telecommunication Tower Infrastructure Developers from 2005 to 2016.

As Indonesian telecommunication tower developer, he is renowned as developer of 14,000 telecommunication towers across Indonesia. Due to his works and contribution for providing internet and communication access in Indonesia, he is colloquially renowned as Raja Tower or Raja Menara (King of Towers) of Indonesia.

== Political Careers ==
He joined the National Mandate Party in 2009, during Hatta Rajasa tenure as leader of the party and became his supporter. However, for unknown reasons, in 2013 he resigned from the party. He eventually joined Joko Widodo campaign team in 2014 during Joko Widodo 2014 presidential campaign and become one of the campaign strategists, together with Muhammad Prananda Prabowo, Megawati Sukarnoputri's son and Indonesian Democratic Party of Struggle chief strategist. He also appointed as General Treasurer of Joko Widodo 2019 presidential campaign team.

== Ministerial Careers ==
When Rini Soemarno, then Minister of State-Owned Enterprises, become quite problematic and often clashed with People's Representative Council at that time, many politicians including from the ruling Indonesian Democratic Party of Struggle voiced for replacing her. At that time, Trenggono was considered to be replacement of Rini, but until his first administration finished, Joko Widodo did not replace her.

Eventually, Trenggono was appointed as Deputy Minister of Defense, accompanying Prabowo Subianto, which become Minister of Defense. He served from 2019 to 2020 as deputy minister. When Edhy Prabowo, then Minister of Marine Affairs and Fisheries, convicted in a corruption case, he replaced Edhy in the first reshuffle of Onward Indonesia Cabinet since 23 December 2020.

== Personal life ==
Trenggono married to Ernawati.

Political offices
Preceded by Edhy Prabowo	Minister of Maritime Affairs and Fisheries; 2020–present	Incumbent
