= List of districts of the Special Region of Yogyakarta =

The province of Yogyakarta Special Region in Indonesia is divided into 1 city and 4 regencies which in turn are divided administratively into kapanewon or kemantren (districts). A Kapanewon (a subdivision of a regency) is headed by a panewu, while a kemantren (a subdivision of the city), is headed by a mantri pamong praja. These terms replaced the term kecamatan in 2020.

The districts of Yogyakarta Special Region with the regency it falls into are as follows:

- Bambanglipuro, Bantul
- Banguntapan, Bantul
- Bantul, Bantul
- Berbah, Sleman
- Cangkringan, Sleman
- Danurejan, Yogyakarta
- Depok, Sleman
- Dlingo, Bantul
- Galur, Kulon Progo
- Gamping, Sleman
- Gedangsari, Gunung Kidul
- Gedongtengen, Yogyakarta
- Girimulyo, Kulon Progo
- Girisubo, Gunung Kidul
- Godean, Sleman
- Gondokusuman, Yogyakarta
- Gondomanan, Yogyakarta
- Imogiri, Bantul
- Jetis, Bantul
- Jetis, Yogyakarta
- Kalasan, Sleman
- Kalibawang, Kulon Progo
- Karangmojo, Gunung Kidul
- Kasihan, Bantul
- Kokap, Kulon Progo
- Kotagede, Yogyakarta
- Kraton, Yogyakarta
- Kretek, Bantul
- Lendah, Kulon Progo
- Mantrijeron, Yogyakarta
- Mergangsan, Yogyakarta
- Minggir, Sleman
- Mlati, Sleman
- Moyudan, Sleman
- Nanggulan, Kulon Progo
- Ngaglik, Sleman
- Ngampilan, Yogyakarta
- Ngawen, Gunung Kidul
- Ngemplak, Sleman
- Nglipar, Gunung Kidul
- Pajangan, Bantul
- Pakem, Sleman
- Pakualaman, Yogyakarta
- Paliyan, Gunung Kidul
- Pandak, Bantul
- Panggang, Gunung Kidul
- Panjatan, Kulon Progo
- Patuk, Gunung Kidul
- Pengasih, Kulon Progo
- Piyungan, Bantul
- Playen, Gunung Kidul
- Pleret, Bantul
- Ponjong, Gunung Kidul
- Prambanan, Sleman
- Pundong, Bantul
- Purwosari, Gunung Kidul
- Rongkop, Gunung Kidul
- Samigaluh, Kulon Progo
- Sanden, Bantul
- Saptosari, Gunung Kidul
- Sedayu, Bantul
- Semanu, Gunung Kidul
- Semin, Gunung Kidul
- Sentolo, Kulon Progo
- Sewon, Bantul
- Seyegan, Sleman
- Sleman, Sleman
- Srandakan, Bantul
- Tanjungsari, Gunung Kidul
- Tegalrejo, Yogyakarta
- Temon, Kulon Progo
- Tempel, Sleman
- Tepus, Gunung Kidul
- Turi, Sleman
- Umbulharjo, Yogyakarta
- Wates, Kulon Progo
- Wirobrajan, Yogyakarta
- Wonosari, Gunung Kidul
