= Wirobrajan =

District of Indonesia

- Subdistrict
- Interactive map of Wirobrajan
- Coordinates: 7.80528°S 110.34778°E
- Country: Indonesia
- region: Yogyakarta Special Region
- city: Yogyakarta

Population (2020)
  - Total: 24,739

Wirobrajan (Aksara Bali: ᬓ᭄ᬭᬢᭀᬦ᭄) is a kecamatan of Yogyakarta, Indonesia. As of 2020, it had a population of 24,739 people.

== Education ==
The following school is located in Wirobrajan:

- SMA Negeri 1 Yogyakarta

== Climate ==
Wirobrajan has a savannah climate. Its average annual temperature is 25 °C (77 °F) with annual rainfall amounting to 2,802 mm (110.3 in).

== Subdivisions ==
Wirobrajan consists of three villages:

- Pakuncen
- Wirobrajan
- Patangpuluhan
