= Kemusuk =

Coordinates: 7°49′00″S 110°16′59″E

Kemusuk is a hamlet (dukuh) in the Argomulyo village, Sedayu subdistrict, Bantul Regency, Special Region of Yogyakarta, Indonesia. The area, around 10 km to the west of Yogyakarta towards the town of Wates, is known as the birthplace of the second president of Indonesia, Suharto.

== Significance with Suharto's life and family ==
Suharto was born to a 'poor but not unimportant farmer's family' in the village. His father, Kertosudiro, was a local irrigation official in charge of overseeing the allocation of water to different farmers in Kemusuk. His mother, Sukirah, was a village woman from a nearby hamlet.

The Suharto family have returned to the village on various occasions in recent years. Suharto himself, accompanied by members of his family, made a trip to Kemusuk in 2002 to pay respects to his father's grave. At the time Suharto's younger step-brother, Notosuwito, had a house in the village near the graveyard in the Kepoh area. More recently, in March 2013 several of Suharto's children, along with his half-brother Probosutedjo, visited Kemusuk Lor (North Kemusuk) to attend the unveiling of a statue of their father installed near a series of exhibits (photos and some dioramas) about Suharto's life at a hall in the village. The statue of Soeharto, which is 3.5 meters tall, presents him in full military uniform as the commander of the Indonesian National Armed Forces (Tentara Nasional Indonesia, or TNI) carrying a baton under his left arm. The sculptor of the statue was the well-known Indonesian sculptor Edhi Sunarso. Edhi Sunarso has created various other well-known statues and monuments in Indonesia including the landmark Selamat Datang Monument (Welcome Monument) in Jakarta.

In June 2013 additional facilities as part of a memorial to Suharto were opened in a ceremony in Kemusuk by Suharto's eldest daughter Siti Hardiyanti Rukmana (Tutut) and his brother Probosutedjo. The memorial included refurbished houses which various members of Suharto's family had lived in as well as a museum. The ceremony was attended by several senior ministers of the Indonesian government including the Coordinating People's Welfare Minister Agung Laksono and Defence Minister Purnomo Yusgiantoro.

At the time of Suharto's death in January 2008, residents of Kemusuk joined in the mourning for the former president. Flags were lowered in the village and Suharto's nephew, Aryo Notosuwito spoke in memory of Suharto. As is the practice in Indonesia, members of the local community gathered together at the house of Suharto's relatives to remember the former resident of their village.

Later, in March 2018, when Suharto's brother Probosutedjo died in Jakarta, his body was flown back to Yogyakarta and transferred to Kemusuk to be buried in the local Somenggalan cemetery.
