= Ministry of Marine Affairs and Fisheries =

Government ministry of Indonesia

Ministry of Maritime Affairs and Fisheries
- Kementerian Kelautan dan Perikanan

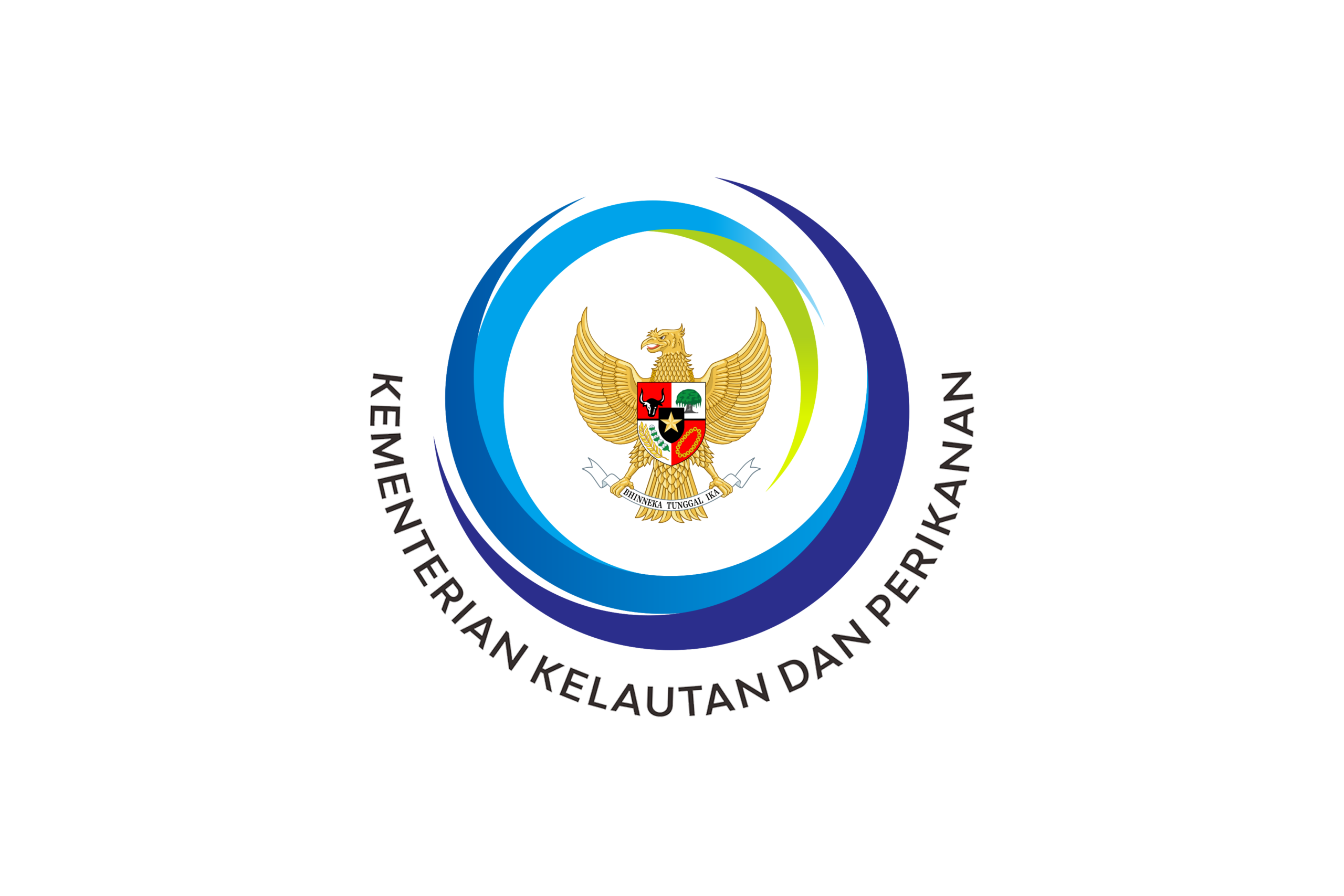
- Flag of the Ministry of Maritime Affairs and Fisheries

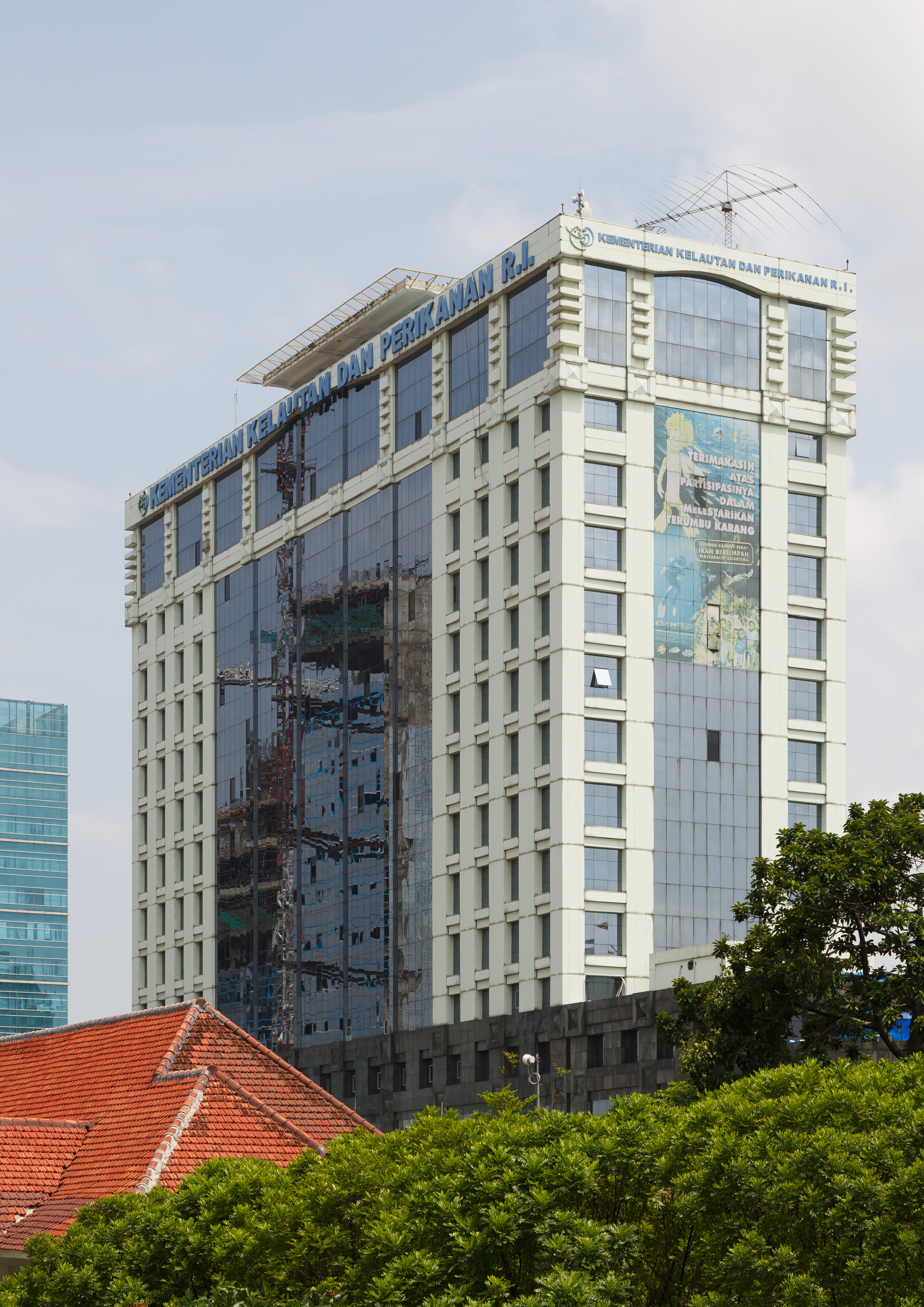
- Ministry of Maritime Affairs and Fisheries headquarters

Ministry overview
- Formed: 26 October 1999
- Jurisdiction: Government of Indonesia
- Headquarters: Gedung Mina Bahari I 5th Floor Jalan Medan Merdeka Timur No. 16 Jakarta Pusat 10110 Jakarta, Indonesia
- Minister responsible: Sakti Wahyu Trenggono, Minister of Maritime Affairs and Fisheries
- Parent department: Coordinating Ministry for Food Affairs
- Website: kkp.go.id

The Ministry of Maritime Affairs and Fisheries (Kementerian Kelautan dan Perikanan, KKP) is a government ministry that organizes marine affairs and fisheries within the Government of Indonesia.

== Task and function ==
The Ministry of Maritime Affairs and Fisheries' primary task is to marine affairs and fisheries in Indonesia; its functions are as follows:

1. To develop, establish, and execute maritime affairs and fisheries policies.
2. Asset management within the Ministry of Marine Affairs and Fisheries.
3. Supervision of execution of maritime affairs and fisheries activity.
4. Provider of technical support and supervision at the regional level.
5. Executor of national-level technical assistance.

A recent national initiative is the “Blue Halo S” initiative, delivered with partners including Konservasi Indonesia and Conservation International, to strengthen marine conservation and sustainable fisheries management.

== Organizational structure ==
Based on the Presidential Decrees 193/2024 and 112/2025 and expanded with the Ministry of Marine Affairs and Fisheries Decrees No. 2/2025, 15/2025, and 17/2025, the ministry consisted of:

- Office of the Minister of Marine Affairs and Fisheries
- Office of the Deputy Minister of Marine Affairs and Fisheries
- General Secretariat
  - Bureau of Planning
  - Bureau of Finance and State-owned Assets
  - Bureau of Human Resource and Organization
  - Bureau of Legal Affairs
  - Bureau of Public Relation and International Cooperations
  - Bureau of General Affairs
  - Bureau of Procurement
  - Indonesian Information Management Center for Maritime and Fisheries Resources
  - Indonesian Marine and Fisheries Business Capital Management Agency (Supervised Public Organization)
    - Division of Planning and General Affairs
    - Business Division I (Funding provision for MSMBEs in Capture Fisheries and Maritime Industries)
    - Business Division II (Funding provision for MSMBEs in Fishes Cultivation, Fish Processing, and Salt-making Industries)
    - Division of Debt Management
    - Division of Finance
    - Internal Supervisory Unit
- Directorate General of Sea Spatial Management
  - Office of the Director General of Sea Spatial Management
  - Directorate General of Sea Spatial Management Secretariat
  - Directorate of Aquatic Spatial Management
  - Directorate of Coastal Areas and Small Islands Spatial Utilization
  - Directorate of Sea Column and Seabed Spatial Utilization
  - Directorate of Sea Spatial Control
- Directorate General of Maritime Management
  - Office of the Director General of Maritime Management
  - Directorate General of Maritime Management Secretariat
  - Directorate of Ecosystem Conservation
  - Directorate of Aquatic Species and Genetic Resources Conservation
  - Directorate of Coasts and Small Islands
  - Directorate of Maritime Services
  - Directorate of Maritime Resources
  - Pekanbaru National Waters Reserve Conservation Station
  - Sorong Coastal and Sea Resources Management Station
  - Serang Coastal and Sea Resources Management Station
  - Indonesian Institute for Coastal and Sea Resources Management, Denpasar
  - Indonesian Institute for Coastal and Sea Resources Management, Makassar
  - Indonesian Institute for Coastal and Sea Resources Management, Pontianak
  - Indonesian Institute for Coastal and Sea Resources Management, Padang
  - Indonesian Institute for Coastal and Sea Resources Management, Kupang
  - Indonesian Center for Salt Production, Kupang
  - Indonesian Institute for Salt Production, Cirebon
  - Indonesian Station for Salt Production, Maros
- Directorate General of Capture Fisheries
  - Office of the Director General of Capture Fisheries
  - Directorate General of Capture Fisheries Secretariat
  - Directorate of Fisheries Resource Management
  - Directorate of Fish Capturing Ships and Equipment
  - Directorate of Fishery Ports
    - Sub-directorate of Fishery Port Harbormaster
  - Directorate of Fishery Businesses
  - Directorate of Fishermen Protection and Empowerment
    - Sub-directorate of Fishermen Protection
  - Indonesian Center for Capture Fishes, Semarang
  - National Commission for Fishery Resources Assessment
  - Indonesian Fishery Management Institutions for Maritime Fishery
    - Zone PL 571 (Indonesian part of Malacca Strait and Indonesian part of Andaman Sea)
    - Zone PL 572 (Off-coast West Sumateran waters of Indian Ocean and Sunda Strait)
    - Zone PL 573 (Off-coast Southern Indonesian waters of Indian Ocean (along Java, Bali, and West Nusa Tenggaras), Sawu Sea, and Western Timor Sea)
    - Zone PL 711 (Karimata Strait, Natuna Sea, and South China Sea)
    - Zone PL 712 (Java Sea)
    - Zone PL 713 (Makassar Sea, Gulf of Bone, Flores Sea, and Bali Sea)
    - Zone PL 714 (Gulf of Tolo and Banda Sea)
    - Zone PL 715 (Gulf of Tomini, Maluku Sea, Halmahera Sea, Seram Sea, and Gulf of Berau)
    - Zone PL 716 (Sulawesi Sea and Northern Halmaheran waters)
    - Zone PL 717 (Gulf of Cendrawasih and Off-coast Northern Papuan waters of Pacific Ocean)
    - Zone PL 718 (Aru Sea, Arafura Sea, and Eastern Timor Sea)
  - Indonesian Fishery Management Institutions for Terrestrial Fishery
    - Zone PD 411 (Northern Papua Regions and surrounding islands)
    - Zone PD 412 (Southern Papua Regions and surrounding islands)
    - Zone PD 413 (Western Papua Regions and surrounding islands)
    - Zone PD 421 (Sulawesi Island and surrounding islands)
    - Zone PD 422 (Nusa Tenggaras and surrounding islands)
    - Zone PD 431 (Eastern Java Regions and surrounding islands, including Bali and Nusa Penida Islands and surrounding islands)
    - Zone PD 432 (Southern Java Regions and surrounding islands)
    - Zone PD 433 (West Northern Java Regions and surrounding islands)
    - Zone PD 434 (Central Northern Java Regions and surrounding islands)
    - Zone PD 435 (Southern and Western Kalimantan Regions and surrounding islands)
    - Zone PD 436 (Eastern Kalimantan Regions and surrounding islands)
    - Zone PD 437 (Northern Kalimantan Regions and surrounding islands)
    - Zone PD 438 (Eastern Sumateran Regions and surrounding islands)
    - Zone PD 439 (Northern and Western Sumateran Regions and surrounding islands)
  - Teluk Batang Coastal Fisheries Port
  - Pengambengan National Fisheries Port
  - Sungai Liat National Fisheries Port
  - Kwandang National Fisheries Port
  - Pekalongan National Fisheries Port
  - Tual National Fisheries Port
  - Sibolga National Fisheries Port
  - Pemangkat National Fisheries Port
  - Prigi National Fisheries Port
  - Palabuhan Ratu National Fisheries Port
  - Ambon National Fisheries Port
  - Kejawanan National Fisheries Port
  - Karangantu National Fisheries Port
  - Tanjung Pandan National Fisheries Port
  - Brondong National Fisheries Port
  - Ternate National Fisheries Port
  - Bitung Deep Sea/Oceanic Fisheries Port
  - Bungus Deep Sea/Oceanic Fisheries Port
  - Cilacap Deep Sea/Oceanic Fisheries Port
  - "Nizam Zachman" Deep Sea/Oceanic Fisheries Port, Jakarta
  - Belawan Deep Sea/Oceanic Fisheries Port
  - Kendari Deep Sea/Oceanic Fisheries Port
- Directorate General of Aquaculture
  - Office of the Director General of Aquaculture
  - Directorate General of Aquaculture Secretariat
  - Directorate of Freshwater Aquaculture
  - Directorate of Brackish Water Aquaculture
  - Directorate of Maritime Aquaculture
  - Directorate of Seaweeds
  - Directorate of Facilities and Infrastructures
  - Indonesian Center for Freshwater Aquaculture, Sukabumi
  - Indonesian Institute for Freshwater Aquaculture, Tatelu
  - Indonesian Institute for Freshwater Aquaculture, Mandiangin
  - Indonesian Institute for Freshwater Aquaculture, Sungai Gelam
  - Indonesian Center for Brackish Water Aquaculture, Jepara
  - Indonesian Institute for Brackish Water Aquaculture, Batee
  - Indonesian Institute for Brackish Water Aquaculture, Situbondo
  - Indonesian Institute for Brackish Water Aquaculture, Takalar
  - Indonesian Center for Maritime Aquaculture, Lampung
  - Indonesian Institute for Maritime Aquaculture, Ambon
  - Indonesian Institute for Maritime Aquaculture, Lombok
  - Indonesian Institute for Maritime Aquaculture, Batam
  - Indonesian Institute for Aquaculture Production Businesses Services, Karawang
  - Indonesian Institute for Fishery Health and Environmental Testing, Serang
  - Indonesian Institute for Superior Shrimp and Cockle Broodstock Production, Karangasem
- Directorate General of Competitive Improvement of Marine Products and Fisheries
  - Office of the Director General of Competitive Improvement of Marine Products and Fisheries
  - Directorate General of Competitive Improvement of Marine Products and Fisheries Secretariat
  - Directorate of Facilities and Infrastructures
  - Directorate of Businesses Empowerment
  - Directorate of Processing
  - Directorate of Marketing
  - Directorate of Accessibility and Promotion
  - Indonesian Center for Testing and Application of Marine Products and Fisheries
- Directorate General of Marine and Fisheries Resources Surveillance
  - Office of the Director General of Marine and Fisheries Resources Surveillance
  - Directorate General of Marine and Fisheries Resources Surveillance Secretariat
  - Directorate of Surveillance Facilities and Infrastructures
  - Directorate of Fleets Operation Control
    - Sub-directorate of Surveillance Ships and Planes Operation
  - Directorate of Marine Resources Surveillance
    - Sub-directorate of Maritime Spatial Utilization Surveillance
    - Sub-directorate of Surveillance of Utilization and Business Operations of Maritime Resources, Coasts, and Small Islands
  - Directorate of Fisheries Resources Surveillance
    - Sub-directorate of Capture Fishery Surveillance
    - Sub-directorate of Surveillance of Processing, Distribution, and Marketing of Fishery Products
  - Directorate of Violations Prosecution
    - Sub-directorate of Criminal Prosecution in Maritime and Fishery
    - Sub-directorate of Maritime Administrative Sanction
    - Sub-directorate of Fishery Administrative Sanction
  - Marine and Fisheries Resources Surveillance Base, Lampulo
  - Marine and Fisheries Resources Surveillance Base, Bitung
  - Marine and Fisheries Resources Surveillance Base, Batam
  - Marine and Fisheries Resources Surveillance Base, Tual
  - Marine and Fisheries Resources Surveillance Base, Jakarta
  - Marine and Fisheries Resources Surveillance Base, Benoa
  - Marine and Fisheries Resources Surveillance Station, Kupang
  - Marine and Fisheries Resources Surveillance Station, Biak
  - Marine and Fisheries Resources Surveillance Station, Tarakan
  - Marine and Fisheries Resources Surveillance Station, Pontianak
  - Marine and Fisheries Resources Surveillance Station, Belawan
  - Marine and Fisheries Resources Surveillance Station, Tahuna
  - Marine and Fisheries Resources Surveillance Station, Cilacap
  - Marine and Fisheries Resources Surveillance Station, Ambon
- General Inspectorate
  - Office of the General Inspectorate
  - General Inspectorate Secretariat
  - Inspectorate I
  - Inspectorate II
  - Inspectorate III
  - Inspectorate IV
  - Inspectorate V
- Agency for Extension and Human Resources Development of Marine Affairs and Fisheries
  - Extension Center for Marine Affairs and Fisheries
  - Education Center for Marine Affairs and Fisheries
  - Training Center for Marine Affairs and Fisheries
  - Center for Standardization and Certification of Marine Affairs and Fisheries Human Resources
  - Vocational Fisheries High Schools
    - Ladong Vocational Fisheries High School, Aceh
    - Pariaman Vocational Fisheries High School, Pariaman
    - Kota Agung Vocational Fisheries High School, Lampung
    - Pontianak Vocational Fisheries High School, Pontianak
    - Waiheru Vocational Fisheries High School, Ambon
    - Tegal Vocational Fisheries High School, Tegal
    - Waiheru Vocational Fisheries High School, Ambon
    - Bone Vocational Fisheries High School, Bone
    - Kupang Vocational Fisheries High School, Kupang
    - Sorong Vocational Fisheries High School, Sorong
  - Ministry Human Resources and Fishery Extension Training Schools
    - Indonesian Institute for Apparatuses Education and Training, Sukamandi
    - Indonesian Institute for Training and Fishery Extension, Banyuwangi
    - Indonesian Institute for Training and Fishery Extension, Tegal
    - Indonesian Institute for Training and Fishery Extension, Bitung
    - Indonesian Institute for Training and Fishery Extension, Ambon
    - Indonesian Institute for Training and Fishery Extension, Medan
  - Polytechnics and Universities
    - Jembrana Maritime and Fisheries Polytechnic
    - Dumai Maritime and Fisheries Polytechnic
    - Wakatobi Maritime and Fisheries Community Academy
    - Bone Maritime and Fisheries Polytechnic
    - Kupang Maritime and Fisheries Polytechnic
    - Karawang Maritime and Fisheries Polytechnic
    - Sorong Maritime and Fisheries Polytechnic
    - Sidoarjo Maritime and Fisheries Polytechnic
    - Bitung Maritime and Fisheries Polytechnic
    - Jakarta Fisheries Entrepreneur Polytechnic
    - Bitung Maritime and Fisheries Polytechnic
  - Research and Production Institutes
    - Seaweed Research Station, Boalemo Gorontalo
    - Fishery Postharvest Mechanization Research Station, Bantul
    - Tuna Research Station, Benoa
    - Maritime Engineering Research Station, Wakatobi
    - Coastal Resources and Insecurity Research Station, Padang
    - Indonesian Research Institute for Ornamental Fisheries, Depok
    - Indonesian Research Institute for Fish Breeding, Sukamandi
    - Indonesian Research Institute for Fishery Resources Recovery, Jatiluhur
    - Indonesian Research Institute for Marine Fisheries, Jakarta
    - Indonesian Research and Fishery Extension Institute for Freshwater Fisheries, Bogor
    - Indonesian Research and Fishery Extension Institute for Brackish Water Fisheries, Maros
    - Indonesian Research and Fishery Extension Institute for General Fisheries, Palembang
    - Indonesian Research and Fishery Extension Center for Marine Fisheries, Gondol (already relinquished to National Research and Innovation Agency)
    - Indonesian Research Center for Marine and Fishery Social and Economic Research, Jakarta
- Agency for Marine and Fisheries Products Quality Control and Monitoring
  - Center for Quality Management
  - Center for Primary Products Quality
  - Center for Post-harvest Quality
  - Marine and Fisheries Products Quality Control and Monitoring Station, Jambi
  - Marine and Fisheries Products Quality Control and Monitoring Station, Mamuju
  - Marine and Fisheries Products Quality Control and Monitoring Station, Tahuna
  - Marine and Fisheries Products Quality Control and Monitoring Station, Tanjung Balai Asahan
  - Marine and Fisheries Products Quality Control and Monitoring Station, Luwuk Banggai
  - Marine and Fisheries Products Quality Control and Monitoring Station, Baubau
  - Marine and Fisheries Products Quality Control and Monitoring Station, Cirebon
  - Marine and Fisheries Products Quality Control and Monitoring Station, Sorong
  - Marine and Fisheries Products Quality Control and Monitoring Station, Pekanbaru
  - Marine and Fisheries Products Quality Control and Monitoring Station, Aceh
  - Marine and Fisheries Products Quality Control and Monitoring Station, Kupang
  - Marine and Fisheries Products Quality Control and Monitoring Station, Palangkaraya
  - Marine and Fisheries Products Quality Control and Monitoring Station, Padang
  - Marine and Fisheries Products Quality Control and Monitoring Station, Kendari
  - Marine and Fisheries Products Quality Control and Monitoring Station, Pontianak
  - Marine and Fisheries Products Quality Control and Monitoring Station, Merauke
  - Marine and Fisheries Products Quality Control and Monitoring Station, Yogyakarta
  - Marine and Fisheries Products Quality Control and Monitoring Station, Batam
  - Marine and Fisheries Products Quality Control and Monitoring Station, Palembang
  - Marine and Fisheries Products Quality Control and Monitoring Station, Palu
  - Marine and Fisheries Products Quality Control and Monitoring Station, Bima
  - Marine and Fisheries Products Quality Control and Monitoring Station, Medan II
  - Marine and Fisheries Products Quality Control and Monitoring Station, Bandung
  - Marine and Fisheries Products Quality Control and Monitoring Station, Gorontalo
  - Marine and Fisheries Products Quality Control and Monitoring Station, Pangkal Pinang
  - Marine and Fisheries Products Quality Control and Monitoring Station, Merak
  - Marine and Fisheries Products Quality Control and Monitoring Station, Bengkulu
  - Marine and Fisheries Products Quality Control and Monitoring Station, Ternate
  - Indonesian Institute for Marine and Fisheries Products Quality Control and Monitoring, Lampung
  - Indonesian Institute for Marine and Fisheries Products Quality Control and Monitoring, Tanjung Pinang
  - Indonesian Institute for Marine and Fisheries Products Quality Control and Monitoring, Entikong
  - Indonesian Institute for Marine and Fisheries Products Quality Control and Monitoring, Mataram
  - Indonesian Institute for Marine and Fisheries Products Quality Control and Monitoring, Denpasar
  - Indonesian Institute for Marine and Fisheries Products Quality Control and Monitoring, Tarakan
  - Indonesian Institute for Marine and Fisheries Products Quality Control and Monitoring, Jakarta II
  - Indonesian Institute for Marine and Fisheries Products Quality Control and Monitoring, Medan I
  - Indonesian Institute for Marine and Fisheries Products Quality Control and Monitoring, Manado
  - Indonesian Institute for Marine and Fisheries Products Quality Control and Monitoring, Surabaya I
  - Indonesian Institute for Marine and Fisheries Products Quality Control and Monitoring, Surabaya II
  - Indonesian Institute for Marine and Fisheries Products Quality Control and Monitoring, Balikpapan
  - Indonesian Institute for Marine and Fisheries Products Quality Control and Monitoring, Banjarmasin
  - Indonesian Institute for Marine and Fisheries Products Quality Control and Monitoring, Jayapura
  - Indonesian Institute for Marine and Fisheries Products Quality Control and Monitoring, Ambon
  - Indonesian Institute for Marine and Fisheries Products Quality Control and Monitoring, Semarang
  - Indonesian Center for Marine and Fisheries Products Quality Control and Monitoring, Jakarta I
  - Indonesian Center for Marine and Fisheries Products Quality Control and Monitoring, Makassar
- Center for Data, Statistics, and Information
- Center for Strategic Policy Studies
- Board of Experts
  - Special Advisor to the Minister on Economics, Social, and Cultural Affairs
  - Special Advisor to the Minister on Community and Inter-institutional Relations
  - Special Advisor to the Minister on Ecology and Marine Resources
  - Special Advisor to the Minister on Upstreaming and Market Diversification

== Minister of Marine Affairs and Fisheries ==
No.	Portrait	Minister	Took office	Left office	Time in office	Cabinet
2	Sarwono Kusumaatmadja (id)	Sarwono Kusumaatmadja (id) (24 July 1943–27 May 2023) as Minister of Marine Exploration	26 October 1999	1 June 2001	1 year, 218 days	National Unity (26 October 1999 – 23 July 2001)
3	Rokhmin Dahuri	Rokhmin Dahuri (born 16 November 1958) as Minister of Marine Affairs and Fisheries	1 June 2001	20 October 2004	3 years, 72 days	National Unity (since 1 June 2001); Mutual Assistance (10 August 2001 – 20 October 2004)
4	Freddy Numberi	Vice Admiral (ret.); Freddy Numberi (born 15 October 1947) as Minister of Marine Affairs and Fisheries	21 October 2004	20 October 2009	4 years, 364 days	United Indonesia (21 October 2004 – 20 October 2009)
5	Fadel Muhammad	Fadel Muhammad (born 20 May 1952) as Minister of Marine Affairs and Fisheries	22 October 2009	19 October 2011	1 year, 362 days	United Indonesia II (22 October 2009 – 20 October 2014)
6	Sharif Cicip Sutarjo (id)	Sharif Cicip Sutarjo (id) (born 10 October 1948) as Minister of Marine Affairs and Fisheries	19 October 2011	20 October 2014	3 years, 1 day	United Indonesia II (22 October 2009 – 20 October 2014)
7	Susi Pudjiastuti	Susi Pudjiastuti (born 15 January 1965) as Minister of Marine Affairs and Fisheries	27 October 2014	20 October 2019	4 years, 358 days	Working (27 October 2014 – 20 October 2019)
8	Edhy Prabowo	Edhy Prabowo (born 24 December 1972) as Minister of Marine Affairs and Fisheries	23 October 2019	25 November 2020	1 year, 33 days	Onward Indonesia Cabinet (23 October 2019 – 20 October 2024)
—	Luhut Pandjaitan	Luhut Pandjaitan (born 28 September 1947); Acting as Minister of Marine Affairs and Fisheries	25 November 2020	2 December 2020	7 days	Onward Indonesia Cabinet (23 October 2019 – 20 October 2024)
—	Syahrul Yasin Limpo	Syahrul Yasin Limpo (born 16 March 1955); Acting as Minister of Marine Affairs and Fisheries	2 December 2020	23 December 2020	21 days	Onward Indonesia Cabinet (23 October 2019 – 20 October 2024)
9	Sakti Wahyu Trenggono	Sakti Wahyu Trenggono (born 3 November 1962) as Minister of Marine Affairs and Fisheries	23 December 2020	Incumbent	5 years, 242 days	Onward Indonesia Cabinet (23 October 2019 – 20 October 2024); Red and White Cabinet (since 21 October 2024)
