= Bantul Regency =

Regency in Yogyakarta, Indonesia

Bantul Regency Kabupaten Bantul ꦑꦧꦸꦥꦠꦺꦤ꧀ꦧꦤ꧀ꦠꦸꦭ꧀
- Regency
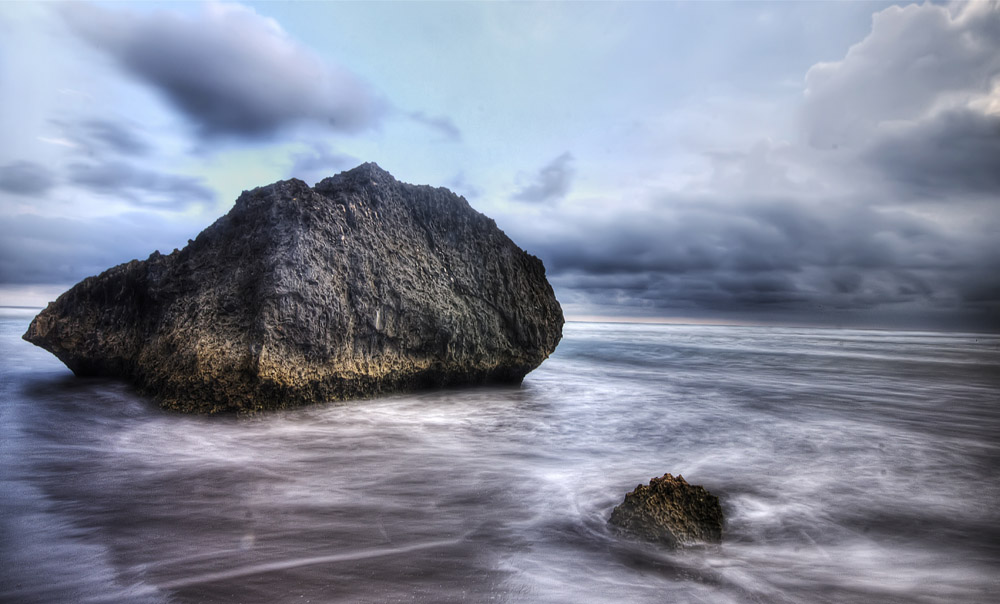
- Parangtritis Beach

- Coat of arms
- Nicknames: Kota Gerabah ("City of Pottery"), Kota Geplak ("City of Geplak"), Kota Sate Klathak ("City of Klathak Satay"), Sahara van Java
- Motto: Bantul Projotamansari (Produktif-Professional, Ijo Royo-royo, Tertib, Aman, Sehat, Asri) ("Productive-Professional, Ijo Royo-royo, Orderly, Safe, Healthy, Beautiful"); Tourism Slogan: The Harmony of Nature and Culture
- Location within Special Region of Yogyakarta

- Location in Java and Indonesia Bantul Regency (Indonesia)
- Coordinates: 7.886447°S 110.327838°E
- Country: Indonesia
- Province: Yogyakarta
- Capital: Bantul

Government
  - Regent: Abdul Halim Muslih
  - Vice Regent: Aris Suharyanta

Area
  - Total: 511.706 km^{2} (197.571 sq mi)

Population (mid 2023 estimate)
  - Total: 1,009,434
  - Density: 1,972.68/km^{2} (5,109.23/sq mi)
- Time zone: UTC+7 (IWST)
- Post code: 55000
- Area code: (+62) 274
- Vehicle registration: AB
- Website: bantulkab.go.id

Bantul (Javanese: ꦧꦤ꧀ꦠꦸꦭ꧀; Indonesian pronunciation: [ˈban̪t̪ʊl]) is a regency located in the Special Region of Yogyakarta, Indonesia. It is located on the island of Java. The regency's population was 911,503 at the 2010 Census, but has risen to 985,770 at the 2020 Census and to 1,009,434 at the official estimates for mid 2023 - comprising 502,280 males and 507,160 females. Like many regencies on the island of Java, it is densely populated with roughly 1,973 people per square kilometre in 2023, although this is largely because the north of the regency partly surrounds the city of Yogyakarta and contains many suburban communities, notably in the densely populated districts of Banguntapan, Sewon and Kasihan, which border the city to the east, south and west.

The regency is bordered by the city of Yogyakarta and Sleman regency to the north, the regency of Kulon Progo to the west, the Gunung Kidul Regency to the east and the Indian Ocean to the south. The town of Bantul is the administrative centre.

The village of Kemusuk in the Sedayu District in the northwest of the regency is the birthplace of former Indonesian President, Suharto.

== 2006 earthquake ==
On 27 May 2006 an earthquake measuring 6.3 on the Richter scale struck near Java's southern coast causing widespread damage. Bantul Regency was the region most affected by the disaster. Around 4,100 residents of Bantul Regency were killed, 12,000 were injured. 72,000 houses were destroyed, and 137,000 were damaged.

== Administrative districts ==
Bantul Regency is divided into seventeen districts (kapanewon), listed below with their areas and their populations at the 2010 Census and the 2020 Census, together with the official estimates as of mid 2023. The table also includes the locations of the district administrative centres, the number of villages (all classed as kalurahan) within each district, and its post codes.

Kode Kemendagri	Name of District (kapanewon)	Area in km^{2}	Pop'n 2010 Census	Pop'n 2020 Census	Pop'n mid 2023 Estimate	Admin centre	No. of villages	Post code
34.02.01	Srandakan	18.510	28,572	30,630	30,960	Trimurti	2	55762
34.02.02	Sanden	23.114	29,667	30,960	31,380	Murtigading	4	55763
34.02.03	Kretek	26.470	29,163	30,320	30,840	Donotirto	5	55772
34.02.04	Pundong	23.110	31,667	35,020	35,720	Srihardono	3	55771
34.02.05	Bambanglipuro	23.095	37,330	40,800	41,470	Sidomulyo	3	55764
34.02.06	Pandak	24.264	47,694	51,500	52,170	Wijirejo	4	55761
34.02.08	Bantul	33.289	59,277	64,360	65,290	Bantul	5	55711 - 55715
34.02.09	Jetis	21.808	51,925	58,470	59,960	Sumberagung	4	55781
34.02.10	Imogiri	23.529	56,219	62,590	63,970	Imogiri	8	55782
34.02.11	Dlingo	54.919	35,504	38,860	39,520	Dlingo	6	55783
34.02.13	Pleret	59.537	43,269	49,820	51,420	Pleret	5	55791
34.02.14	Piyungan	28.421	48,668	54,270	55,500	Srimulyo	3	55792
34.02.12	Banguntapan	24.200	120,015	124,600	126,370	Baturetno	8	55191 - 55198
34.02.15	Sewon	33.259	104,368	109,370	111,890	Panggungharjo	4	55185 - 55188
34.02.16	Kasihan	27.902	110,871	115,050	120,920	Tirtonirmolo	4	55181 - 55184
34.02.07	Pajangan	32.094	32,852	38,250	39,600	Sendangsari	3	55751
34.02.17	Sedayu	34.187	44,450	50,910	52,450	Argorejo	4	55752
	Totals	511.706	911,503	985,770	1,009,434	Bantul	75	

== Turtles nesting ==
Bantul Regency has two locations of turtles nesting, in Gua Cemara Beach and Pelangi Beach. Both have only more than 10 nests each in a year. Nesting period is in July and August.

== Notable people ==
- Aprilia Yuswandari
- Arif Dwi Pangestu
- Kuntowijoyo
- Muhammad Rian Ardianto
- Putri Ariani
- Ronaldo Kwateh
