= Ministry of Social Affairs (Indonesia) =

Government ministry of Indonesia

- Kementerian Sosial
- Logo of the Ministry of Social Affairs

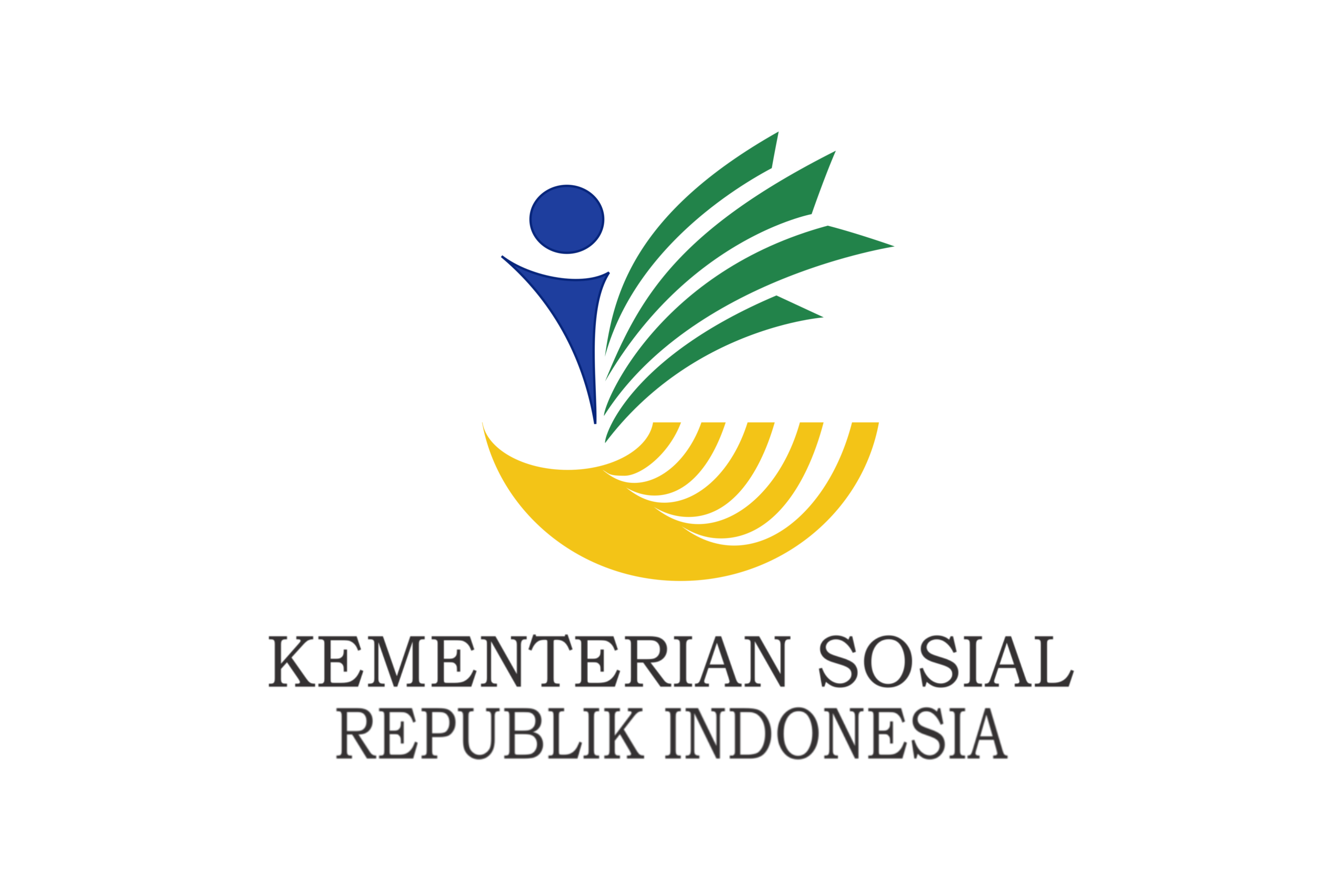
- Flag of the Ministry of Social Affairs

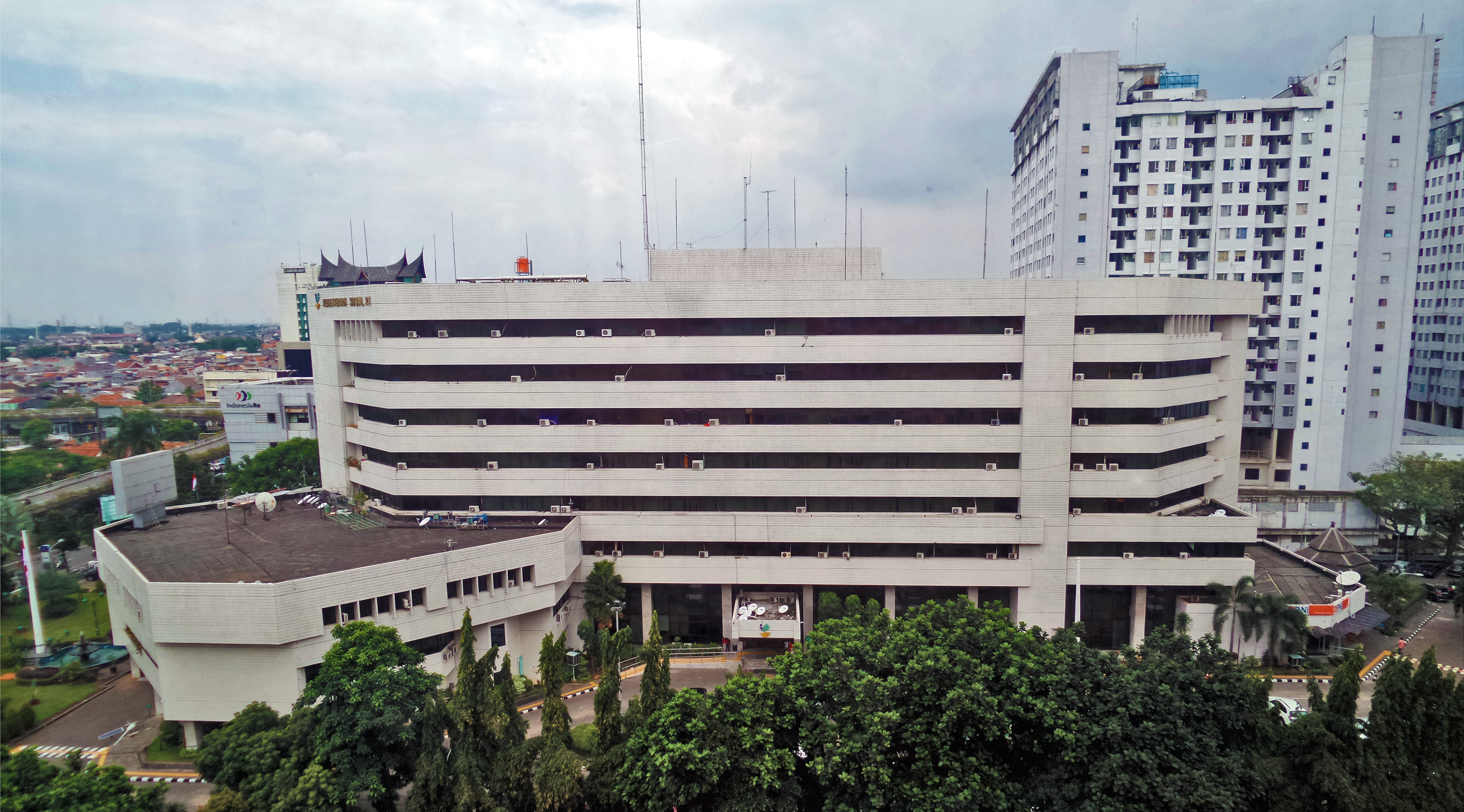
- Ministry of Social Affairs headquarters

Ministry overview
- Formed: August 19, 1945; 81 years ago
- Jurisdiction: Government of Indonesia
- Headquarters: Jl. Salemba Raya No. 28 Jakarta Pusat 10430, Jakarta SCR, Indonesia
- Employees: 3,905 Civil Service employees
- Annual budget: $8.737 billion (FY 2020)
- Minister responsible: Saifullah Yusuf, Minister of Social Affairs
- Deputy Minister responsible: Agus Jabo Priyono, Deputy Minister of Social Affairs
- Parent department: Coordinating Ministry for Social Empowerment
- Website: kemensos.go.id

Ministry of Social Affairs of the Republic of Indonesia (abbreviated as Kemensos, formerly Department of Social Affairs) is a ministry that has the task of organizing and overseeing domestic affairs in Indonesia to assist the president in implementing state governance in the social sector. The Ministry of Social Affairs is led by a Social Minister who since 11 September 2024 has been held by Saifullah Yusuf.

== History ==
The first minister of social affairs in the early days of independence was entrusted to Iwa Kusuma Sumantri. At that time, there were approximately 30 employees for the Labor and Social Affairs departments. Initially, the Ministry of Social Affairs office was located at Jalan Cemara no. 5 Jakarta, but when the capital city of the Indonesian Republic was moved to Yogyakarta, on January 10, 1946, the Ministry of Social Affairs moved their headquarters to the seminary building on Jl. Code Yogyakarta. Then, when the Indonesian government moved its capital back to Jakarta, the office of the Ministry of Social Affairs was re-established at Jalan Ir. Juanda 36, Central Jakarta, and has experienced a change of location again to Jalan Salemba Raya 28 Central Jakarta.

During the presidency of Abdurrahman Wahid, the Ministry of Social Affairs and the Ministry of Information were formally dissolved. At that time, Wahid had the idea that social welfare services were sufficient for the community in Indonesia. However, various social welfare problems occurred, such as natural disasters, social disasters, as well as a surge in the population of the homeless and neglected children in Indonesia. As a result, former high-ranking officials of the Ministry of Social Affairs at that time formed an agency that is directly responsible under the president. Thus, the National Social Welfare Agency (BKSN) was formed.

After the formation of the National Social Welfare Agency (BKSN), problems were not immediately resolved. In fact, BKSN was understaffed due to the imbalance of the population and social problems. With such considerations, the Ministry of Social Affairs was re-established in the National Unity Cabinet but merged with the Ministry of Health into the Ministry of Health and Social Welfare. The merging of those two ministries also did not provide an adequate solution to the social welfare problems, and the social problems become increasingly complex.

During the Mutual Assistance Cabinet period, the Ministry of Social Affairs was re-established to carry out development tasks in the field of social welfare.

== Tasks and functions ==
The Ministry of Social Affairs has the task of carrying out affairs in the fields of social rehabilitation, social security, social empowerment, social protection and handling of the poor to assist the President in carrying out state governance. In carrying out its duties, the Ministry of Social Affairs carries out the functions as follows:

1. Formulation, stipulation and implementation of policies in the fields of social rehabilitation, social security, social empowerment, and social protection;
2. Determination of criteria and data for the poor, vulnerable people, and disabled peoples;
3. Establishment of social rehabilitation standards;
4. Coordinating the implementation of duties, coaching, and providing administrative support to all elements of the organization within the Ministry of Social Affairs;
5. Management of State property / assets which is the responsibility of the Ministry of Social Affairs;
6. Supervision of the implementation of tasks within the Ministry of Social Affairs;
7. Implementation of technical guidance and supervision of the implementation of Ministry of Social affairs in the regions;
8. Implementation of education and training, of social welfare, and social counseling, and implementing policies and technical affairs on Sekolah Rakyat initiative; and
9. Implementation of substantive support to all organizational elements within the Ministry of Social Affairs.

== Organizational structure ==
Based on Presidential Decree No. 162/2024 (amended by Presidential Decree No. 22/2026) and Minister of Social Affairs No. 2/2025 and 7/2025, the Ministry of Social Affairs is organized as follows:

1. Office of the Minister of Social Affairs
2. Office of the Deputy Minister of Social Affairs
3. Secretariat General
  1. Bureau of Planning
  2. Bureau of Finance
  3. Bureau of Organization and Human Resources
  4. Bureau of Law
  5. Bureau of Public Relations
  6. Bureau of General Affairs
  7. Secretariat of National Committee on Disability
  8. Secretariat of Employees' Corps of the Republic of Indonesia, Ministry of Social Affairs Branch
4. Directorate General of Social Protection and Social Security
  1. Directorate General of Social Protection and Social Security Secretariat
  2. Directorate of Social Security
  3. Directorate of Non-Disasters Social Protection
  4. Directorate of Social Protection for Victims of Disasters
5. Directorate General of Social Rehabilitation
  1. Directorate General of Social Rehabilitation Secretariat
  2. Directorate of Child Social Rehabilitation
  3. Directorate of Disabled Social Rehabilitation
  4. Directorate of the Socially Disadvantaged and Victims of Human Trafficking
  5. Directorate of Social Rehabilitation of Narcotics, Psychotropics, Additives Misuse Victims and HIV-Positive Persons
  6. Directorate of Elderly Social Rehabilitation
  7. Social Rehabilitation Integrated Centers (4)
  8. Social Rehabilitation Centers (27)
  9. Social Rehabilitation Pioneering Center (1)
6. Directorate General of Social Empowerment
  1. Directorate General of Social Empowerment Secretariat
  2. Directorate of Community Empowerment for Isolated Tribal Communities
  3. Directorate of Community Empowerment for the Poor and the Vulnerable
  4. Directorate of Community Empowerment
  5. Directorate of Social Potency and Social Resources
7. General Inspectorate
  1. General Inspectorate Secretariat
  2. Investigative Inspectorate
  3. Social Protection and Social Security Inspectorate
  4. Social Rehabilitation Inspectorate
  5. Social Empowerment Inspectorate
  6. Supporting Inspectorate
8. Agency for Human Resources Development and Sekolah Rakyat Initiative (formerly Center for Education, Training, and Professional Development)
  1. Indonesian Center for Social Welfare Education and Training, Padang
  2. Indonesian Center for Social Welfare Education and Training, Bandung
  3. Indonesian Center for Social Welfare Education and Training, Yogyakarta
  4. Indonesian Center for Social Welfare Education and Training, Banjarmasin
  5. Indonesian Center for Social Welfare Education and Training, Makassar
  6. Indonesian Center for Social Welfare Education and Training, Jayapura
  7. Polytechnic of Social Welfare "STKS", Bandung
  8. Sekolah Rakyat Initiative
    1. Elementary Sekolah Rakyat (8)
    2. Junior High Sekolah Rakyat (34)
    3. Senior High Sekolah Rakyat (46)
    4. Integrated Sekolah Rakyat (78)
9. Center for Social Welfare Data and Information
10. Board of Experts
  1. Special Advisor on Social Change and Social Dynamics
  2. Special Advisor on Social Welfare Technologies
  3. Special Advisor on Social Accessibility

== List of ministers ==
No	Photo	Name	Affiliation	Cabinet	Took office	Left office	R
1		Iwa Kusumasumantri	Independent	Presidential	19 August 1945	14 November 1945	(Note: No political party existed during this time.)
2		Adjidarmo Tjokronegoro	PS	Sjahrir I	14 November 1945	5 December 1945	(Note: Most sources mentioned PSI, but PSI hadn't existed yet during this time.)
3		Sudarsono Mangunadikusumo	PS	Sjahrir I	5 December 1945	12 March 1946	(Note: Most sources mentioned PSI, but PSI hadn't existed yet during this time.)
4		Maria Ulfah Santoso	Independent	Sjahrir II	12 March 1946	26 June 1946	
4		Maria Ulfah Santoso	Independent	Sjahrir III	2 October 1946	26 June 1947	
5		Soeparjo	PBI	Amir Sjarifuddin I	3 July 1947	11 November 1947	
5		Soeparjo	PBI	Amir Sjarifuddin II	11 November 1947	29 January 1948	
6		Rahendra Kusnan	PNI	Hatta I	29 January 1948	4 August 1949	
—		Sutan Rasjid	PSI	Emergency	19 December 1948	13 July 1949	(Note: Also serving concurrently as Minister of Labor.)
(6)		Rahendra Kusnan	PNI	Hatta II	4 August 1949	20 December 1949	
7		Kosasih Purwanegara	Independent	Federal	20 December 1949	6 September 1950	
8		Fredericus Soetrisno Harjadi	Katolik	Natsir	6 September 1950	3 April 1951	
9		Samsudin	Masyumi	Sukiman-Suwirjo	27 April 1951	3 April 1952	
10		Anwar Tjokroaminoto	PSII	Wilopo	3 April 1952	5 May 1953	
11		Soeroso	Parindra	Wilopo	5 May 1953	30 July 1953	
11		Soeroso	Parindra	Ali Sastroamidjojo I	30 July 1953	12 August 1955	
12		Sudibjo	PSII	Burhanuddin Harahap	12 August 1955	18 January 1956	
—		Sutomo (acting)	PRI	Burhanuddin Harahap	18 January 1956	24 March 1956	
13		Fatah Jasin	NU	Ali Sastroamidjojo II	24 March 1956	14 March 1957	
14		Johannes Leimena	Parkindo	Djuanda	9 April 1957	24 May 1957	
15		Muljadi Djojomartono	Masyumi	Djuanda	24 May 1957	10 July 1959	
16		Mohammad Yamin	Independent	Working I	10 July 1959	30 July 1959	(Note: As the Minister of Social and Cultural Affairs)
(15)		Muljadi Djojomartono	Masyumi	Working I	10 July 1959	18 February 1960	(Note: As the Junior Minister of Social Affairs. Some sources also mentioned the position as Minister of Social Affairs.)
(15)		Muljadi Djojomartono	Masyumi	Working II	18 February 1960	6 March 1962	(Note: As the Minister of Social Prosperity)
17		Rusiah Sardjono	Independent	Working III	6 March 1962	13 November 1963	(Note: Renamed to Minister of Social Affairs)
17		Rusiah Sardjono	Independent	Working IV	13 November 1963	27 August 1964	
17		Rusiah Sardjono	Independent	Dwikora I	27 August 1964	22 February 1966	
17		Rusiah Sardjono	Independent	Dwikora II	24 February 1966	26 March 1966	
(15)		Muljadi Djojomartono	Masyumi	Dwikora III	28 March 1966	25 July 1966	
18		Albert Mangaratua Tambunan	Parkindo	Ampera I	28 July 1966	14 October 1967	
18		Albert Mangaratua Tambunan	Parkindo	Ampera II	14 October 1967	10 June 1968	
18		Albert Mangaratua Tambunan	Parkindo	Development I	10 June 1968	12 December 1970	
—		Idham Chalid (acting)	NU	Development I	12 December 1970	11 September 1971	
19		Mohammad Syafa'at Mintaredja	PPP	Development I	11 September 1971	28 March 1973	
19		Mohammad Syafa'at Mintaredja	PPP	Development II	28 March 1973	29 March 1978	
20		Sapardjo	Golkar	Development III	29 March 1978	19 March 1983	
21		Nani Soedarsono	Golkar	Development IV	19 March 1983	21 March 1988	
22		Haryati Soebadio	Golkar	Development V	21 March 1988	17 March 1993	
23		Endang Kusuma Inten Soeweno	Golkar	Development VI	17 March 1993	14 March 1998	
24		Siti Hardiyanti Rukmana	Golkar	Development VII	14 March 1998	21 May 1998	
25		Justika Baharsjah	Golkar	Development Reform	23 May 1998	20 October 1999	
26		Anak Agung Gde Agung	Independent	National Unity	29 October 1999	23 August 2000	(Note: As the State Minister of Public Issues and Head of the National Social Welfare Agency)
—	Position abolished			National Unity	23 August 2000	23 July 2001	(Note: Merged into the Ministry of Health and Social Welfare)
27		Bachtiar Chamsyah	PPP	Mutual Assistance	10 August 2001	20 October 2004	
27		Bachtiar Chamsyah	PPP	United Indonesia I	21 October 2004	20 October 2009	
28		Salim Segaf Al-Jufri	PKS	United Indonesia II	22 October 2009	20 October 2014	
29		Khofifah Indar Parawansa	PKB	Working	27 October 2014	17 January 2018	
30		Idrus Marham	Golkar	Working	17 January 2018	24 August 2018	
31		Agus Gumiwang Kartasasmita	Golkar	Working	24 August 2018	20 October 2019	
32		Juliari Batubara	PDI-P	Onward Indonesia	23 October 2019	6 December 2020	
—		Muhadjir Effendy (acting)	Independent	Onward Indonesia	6 December 2020	23 December 2020	
33		Tri Rismaharini	PDI-P	Onward Indonesia	23 December 2020	6 September 2024	
—		Muhadjir Effendy (acting)	Independent	Onward Indonesia	6 September 2024	11 September 2024	
34		Saifullah Yusuf	PKB	Onward Indonesia	11 September 2024	20 October 2024	
34		Saifullah Yusuf	PKB	Red and White	21 October 2024	Incumbent	
