= List of ministers of social affairs (Indonesia) =

Minister of Social Affairs
- Logo of the Ministry of Social Affairs

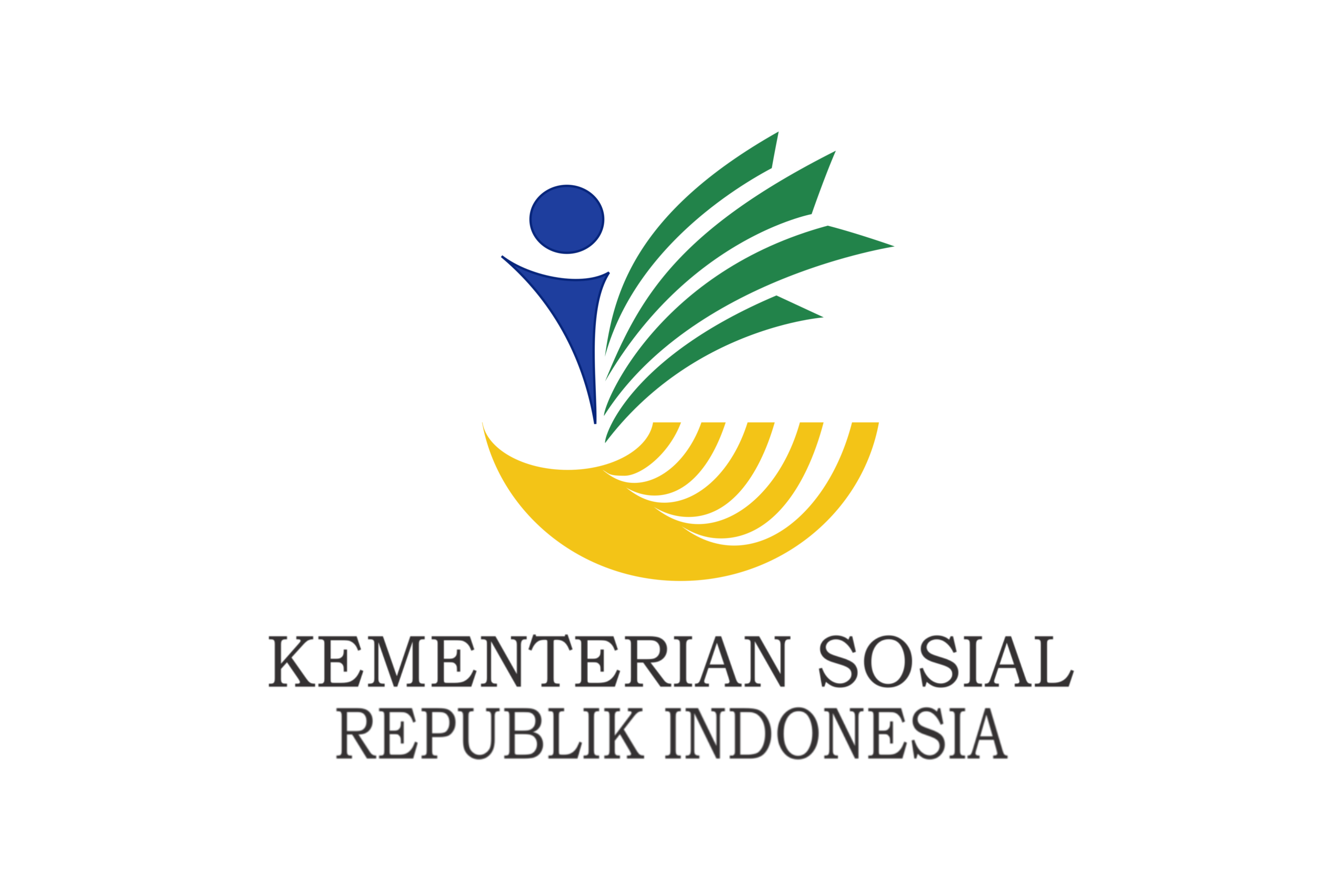
- Flag of the Ministry of Social Affairs

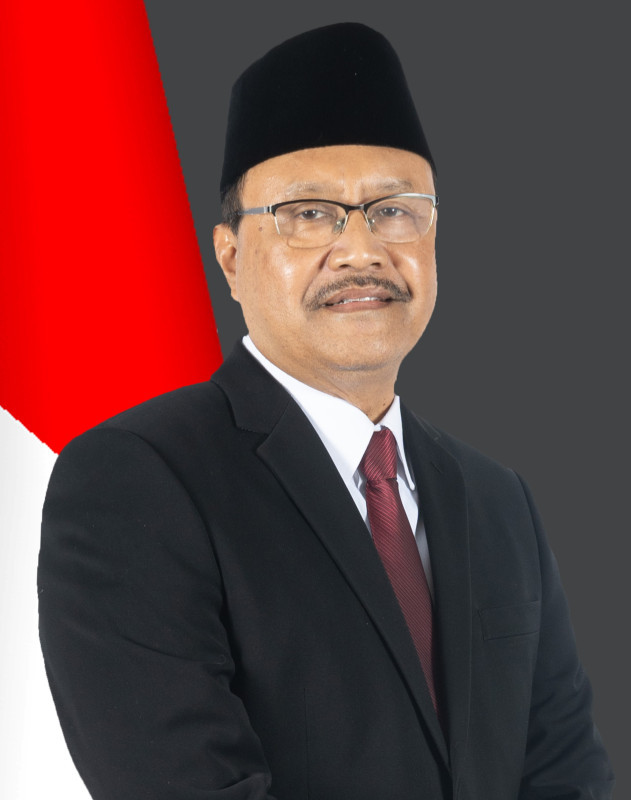
- Incumbent; Saifullah Yusuf since 11 September 2024
- Appointer: President of Indonesia
- Inaugural holder: Iwa Koesoemasoemantri
- Formation: 19 August 1945
- Website: www.kemsos.go.id

This article lists persons and politicians who have been appointed as the minister of social affairs in Indonesia.

No	Photo	Name	Affiliation	Cabinet	Took office	Left office	R
1		Iwa Koesoemasoemantri	Independent	Presidential	19 August 1945	14 November 1945	(Note: No political party existed during this time.)
2		Adjidarmo Tjokronegoro	PS	Sjahrir I	14 November 1945	5 December 1945	(Note: Most sources mentioned PSI, but PSI hadn't existed yet during this time.)
3		Sudarsono Mangunadikusumo	PS	Sjahrir I	5 December 1945	12 March 1946	(Note: Most sources mentioned PSI, but PSI hadn't existed yet during this time.)
4		Maria Ulfah Santoso	Independent	Sjahrir II	12 March 1946	26 June 1946	
4		Maria Ulfah Santoso	Independent	Sjahrir III	2 October 1946	26 June 1947	
5		Soeparjo	PBI	Amir Sjarifuddin I	3 July 1947	11 November 1947	
5		Soeparjo	PBI	Amir Sjarifuddin II	11 November 1947	29 January 1948	
6		Rahendra Kusnan	PNI	Hatta I	29 January 1948	4 August 1949	
—		Sutan Rasjid	PSI	Emergency	19 December 1948	13 July 1949	(Note: Also serving concurrently as Minister of Labor.)
(6)		Rahendra Kusnan	PNI	Hatta II	4 August 1949	20 December 1949	
7		Kosasih Purwanegara	Independent	Federal	20 December 1949	6 September 1950	
8		Fredericus Soetrisno Harjadi	Katolik	Natsir	6 September 1950	3 April 1951	
9		Samsudin	Masyumi	Sukiman-Suwirjo	27 April 1951	3 April 1952	
10		Anwar Tjokroaminoto	PSII	Wilopo	3 April 1952	5 May 1953	
11		Soeroso	Parindra	Wilopo	5 May 1953	30 July 1953	
11		Soeroso	Parindra	Ali Sastroamidjojo I	30 July 1953	12 August 1955	
12		Sudibjo	PSII	Burhanuddin Harahap	12 August 1955	18 January 1956	
—		Sutomo (acting)	PRI	Burhanuddin Harahap	18 January 1956	24 March 1956	
13		Fatah Jasin	NU	Ali Sastroamidjojo II	24 March 1956	14 March 1957	
14		Johannes Leimena	Parkindo	Djuanda	9 April 1957	24 May 1957	
15		Muljadi Djojomartono	Masyumi	Djuanda	24 May 1957	10 July 1959	
16		Mohammad Yamin	Independent	Working I	10 July 1959	30 July 1959	(Note: As the Minister of Social and Cultural Affairs)
(15)		Muljadi Djojomartono	Masyumi	Working I	10 July 1959	18 February 1960	(Note: As the Junior Minister of Social Affairs. Some sources also mentioned the position as Minister of Social Affairs.)
(15)		Muljadi Djojomartono	Masyumi	Working II	18 February 1960	6 March 1962	(Note: As the Minister of Social Prosperity)
17		Rusiah Sardjono	Independent	Working III	6 March 1962	13 November 1963	(Note: Renamed to Minister of Social Affairs)
17		Rusiah Sardjono	Independent	Working IV	13 November 1963	27 August 1964	
17		Rusiah Sardjono	Independent	Dwikora I	27 August 1964	22 February 1966	
17		Rusiah Sardjono	Independent	Dwikora II	24 February 1966	26 March 1966	
(15)		Muljadi Djojomartono	Masyumi	Dwikora III	28 March 1966	25 July 1966	
18		Albert Mangaratua Tambunan	Parkindo	Ampera I	28 July 1966	14 October 1967	
18		Albert Mangaratua Tambunan	Parkindo	Ampera II	14 October 1967	10 June 1968	
18		Albert Mangaratua Tambunan	Parkindo	Development I	10 June 1968	12 December 1970	
—		Idham Chalid (acting)	NU	Development I	12 December 1970	11 September 1971	
19		Mohammad Syafa'at Mintaredja	PPP	Development I	11 September 1971	28 March 1973	
19		Mohammad Syafa'at Mintaredja	PPP	Development II	28 March 1973	29 March 1978	
20		Sapardjo	Golkar	Development III	29 March 1978	19 March 1983	
21		Nani Soedarsono	Golkar	Development IV	19 March 1983	21 March 1988	
22		Haryati Soebadio	Golkar	Development V	21 March 1988	17 March 1993	
23		Endang Kusuma Inten Soeweno	Golkar	Development VI	17 March 1993	14 March 1998	
24		Siti Hardiyanti Rukmana	Golkar	Development VII	14 March 1998	21 May 1998	
25		Justika Baharsjah	Golkar	Development Reform	23 May 1998	20 October 1999	
26		Anak Agung Gde Agung	Independent	National Unity	29 October 1999	23 August 2000	(Note: As the State Minister of Public Issues and Head of the National Social Welfare Agency)
—	Position abolished			National Unity	23 August 2000	23 July 2001	(Note: Merged into the Ministry of Health and Social Welfare)
27		Bachtiar Chamsyah	PPP	Mutual Assistance	10 August 2001	20 October 2004	
27		Bachtiar Chamsyah	PPP	United Indonesia I	21 October 2004	20 October 2009	
28		Salim Segaf Al-Jufri	PKS	United Indonesia II	22 October 2009	20 October 2014	
29		Khofifah Indar Parawansa	PKB	Working	27 October 2014	17 January 2018	
30		Idrus Marham	Golkar	Working	17 January 2018	24 August 2018	
31		Agus Gumiwang Kartasasmita	Golkar	Working	24 August 2018	20 October 2019	
32		Juliari Batubara	PDI-P	Onward Indonesia	23 October 2019	6 December 2020	
—		Muhadjir Effendy (acting)	Independent	Onward Indonesia	6 December 2020	23 December 2020	
33		Tri Rismaharini	PDI-P	Onward Indonesia	23 December 2020	6 September 2024	
—		Muhadjir Effendy (acting)	Independent	Onward Indonesia	6 September 2024	11 September 2024	
34		Saifullah Yusuf	PKB	Onward Indonesia	11 September 2024	20 October 2024	
34		Saifullah Yusuf	PKB	Red and White	21 October 2024	Incumbent	
