= Revised Dwikora Cabinet =

24th cabinet of Indonesia 1966

Revised Dwikora Cabinet Kabinet Dwikora Yang Disempurnakan
- 24th Cabinet of Indonesia
- 1966
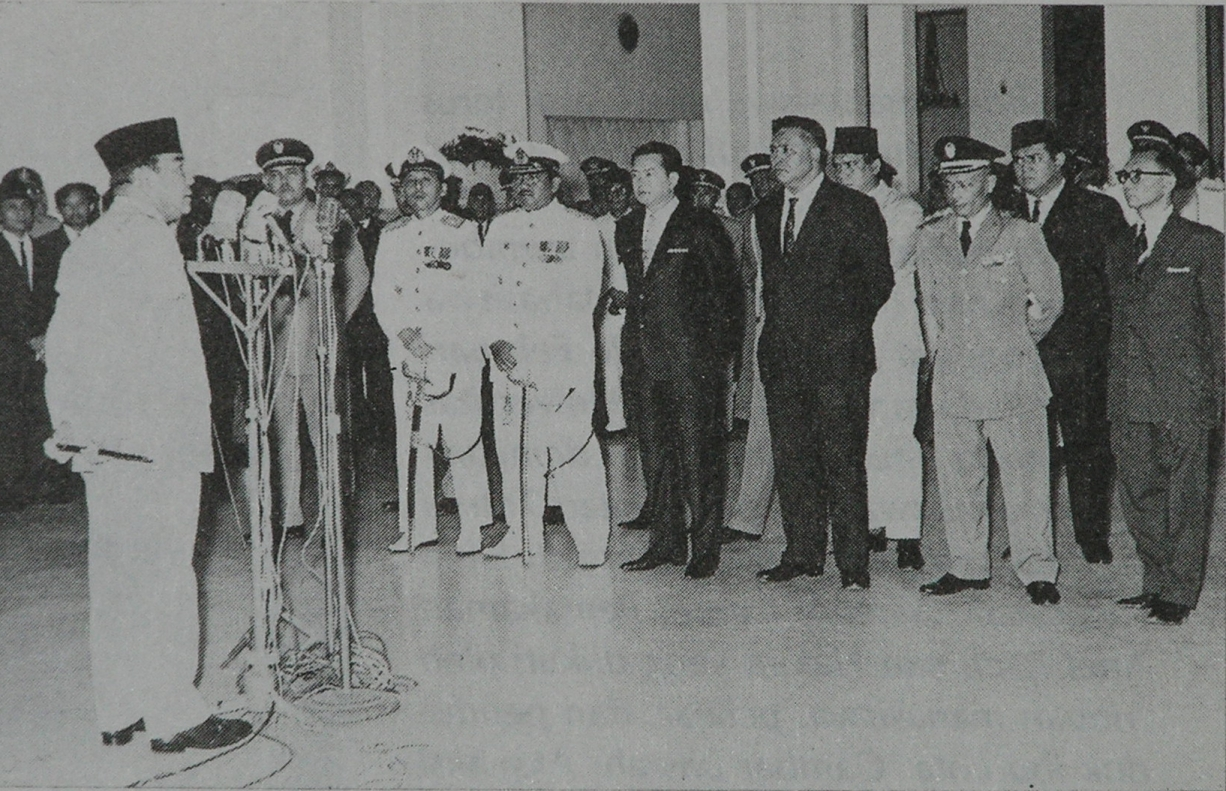
- Date formed: 24 February 1966
- Date dissolved: 27 March 1966
- President: Sukarno
- No. of ministers: 109 ministers

History
- Predecessor: Dwikora I Cabinet
- Successor: Dwikora III Cabinet

The Revised Dwikora Cabinet (Indonesian: Kabinet Dwikora Yang Disempurnakan) was the Indonesian cabinet which served under President Sukarno from February 1966 to March 1966. The cabinet was formed under an extremely tense political situation, and it was expected that this cabinet would address the concerns of the people. It was during a meeting of this cabinet that unidentified troops surrounded the Presidential Palace causing to Sukarno to escape to Bogor from where he gave Supersemar to Lieutenant General Suharto.

== President ==
- President/Prime Minister/Supreme Commander of the National Armed Forces of the Republic/Mandatory of the Provisional People's Consultative Assembly (MPRS)/Great Leader of the Revolution: Sukarno

== Cabinet Presidium ==
- First Deputy Prime Minister/Minister of Foreign Affairs and Foreign Trade: Subandrio
- Second Deputy Prime Minister/Coordinating Minister of Distribution/Minister of Higher Education and Science: Johannes Leimena
- Third Deputy Prime Minister/Chairman of MPRS: Chaerul Saleh
- Fourth Deputy Prime Minister/Vice Chairman of MPRS: Idham Chalid
- Minister of Information: Maj. Gen. Achmadi

== Ministers in the Field of Law and Home Affairs ==
- Coordinating Minister: Sartono
- Minister of Home Affairs/Governor of Jakarta: Maj. Gen. Soemarno Sosroatmojo
- Minister of Justice: A. Astrawinata
- Chief Justice of the Supreme Court: Wirjono Prodjodikoro
- Attorney General: Brig. Gen. Sutardhio

== Ministers in the Field of Defense and Security ==
- Coordinating Minister: Maj. Gen. Sarbini
- Deputy Coordinating Minister: Maj. Gen. Mursyid
- Commander of the Army: Maj. Gen. Suharto
- Commander of the Navy: Rear Admiral Muljadi
- Deputy Commander of the Navy: Maj. Gen. (Marine Corps) Hartono
- Commander of the Air Force: Air Vice Marshal Sri Muljono Herlambang
- Chief of Police: Police Gen. Sutjipto Judodihardjo

== Ministers in the Field of Finance ==
- Coordinating Minister: Sumarno
- Governor of the Central Bank: Jusuf Muda Dalam
- First Lieutenant Governor of the Central Bank: J. D. Massie
- Lieutenant Governors of the Central Bank: Arifin Harahap and Mohamad Hasan
- Minister of State Funds: Surjadi
- Minister of Expenditures: Police Brig. Gen. Hugeng Imam Santoso
- Minister of Insurance: Sucipto S. Amidharmo

== Ministers in the Field of Development ==
- Coordinating Minister/Minister of Tourism: Hamengkubuwono IX
- Minister of Manpower: Sutomo Martopradoto
- Minister of National Research: Suhadi Reksowardojo
- Minister of Oil and Natural Gas: Maj. Gen. Ibnu Sutowo
- Minister of Mining: Armunanto
- Minister of Basic Industries: Brig. Gen. M. Jusuf

== Ministers in the Field of People's Industries ==
- Coordinating Minister: Maj. Gen. Azis Saleh
- Minister of Textile Industry: Brig. Gen. Ashari Danudirdjo
- Minister of Light Industry: Air Vice Marshal Suharnoko Harbani
- Minister of Hand Made Industry: Hadi Thayeb
- Minister of Self-Reliance/Assistant Minister to Coordinating Minister of People's Industries: T. D. Pardede

== Ministers in the Field of Public Works and Energy ==
- Coordinating Minister: Sutami
- Minister of Electricity and Energy: Ir. Setiadi Reksoprodjo
- Minister of Irrigation: P. C. Harjadisudirdja
- Minister of Road Maintenance: Brig. Gen. Hartawan Wirjodiprodjo
- Minister of Job Creations and Constructions: David Gee Cheng
- Minister of Trans-Sumatra Highway: Slamet Bratanata

== Ministers in the Field of Agriculture and Agrarian Affairs ==
- Coordinating Minister: Sadjarwo Djarwonagoro
- Minister of Agriculture: Sukarno
- Minister of Plantations: Frans Seda
- Minister of Forestry: Sudjarwo
- Minister of Agrarian Affairs: Rudolf Hermanses
- Minister of People's Irrigation and Village Development: Surachman

== Ministers in the Field of Distribution ==
- Minister of National Trade: Brig. Gen. Achmad Jusuf
- Minister of Land Transportation: Lt. Gen. Hidayat
- Minister of Post and Telecommunication: Air Chief Marshal Soerjadi Soerjadarma
- Minister of Air Transportation: Partono
- Minister of Transmigration and Cooperatives: Achadi

== Ministers in the Field of Maritime Affairs ==
- Coordinating Minister/Minister of Sea Transportation: Maj. Gen. (Marine Corps) Ali Sadikin
- Minister of Fisheries and Sea Exploration: Rear Admiral Hamzah Atmohandojo
- Minister of Maritime Industries: Mardanus

== Ministers in the Field of Welfare ==
- Coordinating Minister: Muljadi Djojomartono
- Minister of Social Affairs: Rusiah Sardjono
- Minister of Health: Maj. Gen. Dr. Satrio

== Ministers in the Field of Religious Affairs ==
- Coordinating Minister/Minister of Religious Affairs: Sjaifuddin Zuchri
- Minister of Hajj Affairs: Farid Mar'uf
- Minister of Government Liaison with Ulamas: Marzuki Jatim
- Assistant to Minister of Religious Affairs: Abdul Fattah Jasin

== Ministers in the Field of Education and Culture ==
- Coordinating Minister: Prijono
- Minister of Basic Education and Culture: Sumardjo
- Minister of Sports: Maladi

== Ministers in the Field of Communication with the People ==
- Coordinating Minister: Ruslan Abdulgani
- Minister of Government Liaison with MPRS/Mutual Assistance People's Representative Council (DPR-GR)/Supreme Advisory Council (DPA)/National Front: W. J. Rumambi
- Secretary General of the National Front: J. K. Tumakaka

== Presidential Advisers ==
- Presidential Adviser for Funds and Forces: Notohamiprodjo
- Presidential Advisers for National Security: Police Gen. Sukarno Djojonegoro and Munandjat
- Special Minister of Security: Lt. Col. Sjafei

== State Ministers Attached to the Cabinet Presidium ==
- State Ministers: Oei Tjoe Tat, Brig. Gen. Sukendro, Aminuddin Azis, Sudibjo, Brig. Gen. Mudjoko

== State Officials ==
- Vice Chairman of the MPRS: Ali Sastroamidjojo
- Vice Chairman of the MPRS/Chairman of the National Resilience Institute (LEMHANAS): Maj. Gen. Wilujo Puspojudo

== Officials with Ministerial status ==
- State Secretary: M. Ichsan
- Second Vice Chairman of DPA: Sujono Hadinoto
- Deputy Speakers of DPR-GR: Sjarif Thayeb (First Deputy Speaker/Speaker Pro Tempore), Asmara Hadi, Rear Admiral (Navy) Mursalin Daeng Mamangung, Achmad Syaichu
- Financial Auditors: Sukardan, Radius Prawiro, Mochtar Usman, H. A. Pandelaki
- Director General of the National Atomic Agency: G. A. Siwabessy
- Commander of the General Command for the Establishment of Aviation Industry (KOPELAPIP): Air Marshal Omar Dani
- Project Manager for KOPELAPIP: Kurwet Kartaadiredja

== Changes ==
On 18 March 1966, Subandrio, Chaerul Saleh, Setiadi Reksoprodjo, Sumardjo, Oei Tjoe Tat, Jusuf Muda Dalam, Armunanto, Surachman, Sutomo Martopradoto, Astrawinata, Achmadi, Sjafei, J. K. Tumakaka, Achadi, and Soemarno Sosroatmojo were arrested. A number of interim ministers were appointed to replace the 15 arrested ministers as follows:

- Ad interim ministers in the cabinet presidium
  - Hamengkubuwana IX
  - Adam Malik
  - Roeslan Abdulgani
  - Idham Chalid
  - Johannes Leimena
  - Ahmad Sukendro
- Other ad interim ministers
  - Minister of Foreign Affairs and Overseas Economic Relations: Adam Malik
  - Minister of Justice: Chief Justice of the Supreme Court: Wirjono Prodjodikoro
  - Minister of Labor: Frans Seda (retained his position as Minister of Plantations)
  - Minister of Mining: Maj. Gen. Ibnu Sutowo (retained his position as Minister of Oil and Natural Gas)
  - Minister of Electricity and Energy: Sutami (retained his position as Coordinating Minister)

To replace Saleh as Chairman of the Provisional People's Consultative Assembly, Gen. Wiluyo Puspoyudo of the Army was appointed to this position in an acting capacity.
