= David Gee Cheng =

Deputy Minister for City Planning and Construction
- In office 27 August 1964 – 21 May 1966
- President: Sukarno
- Preceded by: office created
- Succeeded by: Rachmat Wiradisuria

Personal details
- Born: 1 September 1915 Shanghai, China
- Died: 16 September 2005 (aged 90) Hawaii, U.S.
- Children: 3
- Awards: Medal for Contributing in the National Development (1964)

David Gee Cheng (1 September 1915 – 16 September 2005) was a Chinese-born Indonesian and American engineer and real estate developer who became the Indonesian Deputy Minister for City Planning and Construction from 1964 until 1966.

== Early life ==
Cheng was born in Shanghai on 1 September 1915 from Tsi Fei and Wai Wen (Liang) Cheng. He studied at St. John's University in Shanghai and graduated with a Bachelor of Science in Civil Engineering in 1939.

== Career ==
Cheng arrived in Indonesia in 1945 and later became the President of the National Housing Development Corporation in 1956. On 16 September 1959, Cheng applied for naturalization as an Indonesian citizen. His application was accepted by a presidential decree on 23 August 1961.

Cheng was appointed by President Sukarno to head the new Department of City Planning and Construction as a deputy minister in the Dwikora Cabinet on 27 August 1964. According to minister Oei Tjoe Tat, Cheng was appointed by Sukarno after successfully straightening Hotel Indonesia's building foundation. Due to his obscurity and the lack of information about him, rumors began to spread about him. Fadjar magazine said that Cheng was unable to speak Indonesian and has unclear nationality, while journalist Bagja Hidayat claimed that Cheng was a "Hong Kong intel man".

During his tenure as minister, Cheng was involved in the construction of the Semanggi Interchange. Cheng and Sutami, the state minister for construction assessment, presented their proposals to President Sukarno. Afterwards, Cheng and Sutami argued with each other about their proposals, with Sukarno observing them. Sukarno later chose Sutami's proposal as a blueprint for the interchange.

Cheng retained his post as deputy minister following two subsequent reshuffles of the cabinet. Despite not being a Sukarno loyalist, he was eventually deposed from his post on 21 May 1966 and was replaced by Rachmat Wiradisuria. He was the last Chinese to ever held a cabinet-level post until 1998, when The Kian Seng (Bob Hasan) took office as Minister of Trade and Industry in Suharto's short-lived Seventh Development Cabinet.

Cheng left Indonesia for the United States in 1966. He arrived on 18 October 1966 and pursued a postgraduate degree at the Harvard Graduate School of Design. He graduated with a degree in 1967. He later resided in Hawaii and became a naturalized US citizen on 26 January 1972.

Cheng became a real estate developer in Hawaii. From 1968 to 1970, Cheng became the development director of the Hawaii Council Housing Action (HCHA) in Honolulu. He was involved in the construction of the Waimānalo townhouse community. He later founded the David Gee Cheng Development Corporation in 1971 and became a member of the Transportation Committee in the Oahu Development Conference. Cheng died on 16 June 2005 at the age of 90.

== Personal life ==
Cheng was married and had three children. He was a Roman Catholic.
