= Widodo (academicus) =

Indonesian biologist and academic

- Born: 11 August 1973 (age 53); Bojonegoro Regency, East Java, Indonesia
- Citizenship: Indonesian
- Education: University of Brawijaya (S.Si.); Bandung Institute of Technology (M.Si.); University of Tsukuba (Ph.D.Med.Sc.)
- Known for: Rector of the University of Brawijaya (2022–2027)
- Awards: Young Investigator Award (2007); Best Original Paper Award, Nestle Nutrition Council Japan (2007); RISTEK-Kalbe Young Scientist Award (2012)
- Scientific career
- Fields: Molecular biology Cancer biology
- Workplaces: University of Brawijaya

Prof. Widodo, S.Si., M.Si., Ph.D.Med.Sc. (born 11 August 1973) is an Indonesian molecular biologist and academic who has served as Rector of the University of Brawijaya (UB) for the 2022–2027 term.

== Early life and education ==
Widodo was born in Bojonegoro Regency, East Java, on 11 August 1973. He completed his undergraduate degree in biology at the University of Brawijaya in 1998. He subsequently earned a master's degree in biology from the Bandung Institute of Technology (ITB) in 2001 and a Doctor of Philosophy in medical science (Ph.D.Med.Sc.) specializing in molecular biology from the University of Tsukuba in Japan in 2008.

== Career ==
Widodo joined the faculty of the Department of Biology at the University of Brawijaya in 2000. His research focuses on cancer biology, cellular senescence, herbal molecular mechanisms (jamu), and viral vaccine development. During the COVID-19 pandemic in Indonesia, he conducted research on glucomannan compounds from porang tubers as potential viral entry inhibitors and participated in developing virus-like particle (VLP) COVID-19 vaccine candidates funded by the National Research and Innovation Agency (BRIN).

Prior to his appointment as rector, Widodo held several academic and administrative positions at the University of Brawijaya, including Chair of the Department of Biology, Director of the Central Laboratory of Life Sciences (LSIH), and Dean of the Faculty of Mathematics and Natural Sciences (FMIPA) from 2020 to 2022.

On 21 May 2022, Widodo was elected by acclamation during a plenary session of the university's Board of Trustees (MWA) chaired by Muhadjir Effendy to serve as Rector of the University of Brawijaya for the 2022–2027 period. He was inaugurated on 27 June 2022 as the university's first rector following its transition to an autonomous state university (PTNBH). During his term, he has emphasized research commercialization, interdisciplinary collaboration, and digital campus infrastructure.

== Awards ==
- Young Investigator Award, Japanese Tissue Culture Association (2007)
- Best Original Paper Award, Nestle Nutrition Council Japan (2007)
- Young Scientist Award, Ministry of Research and Technology and Kalbe Farma (2012)
- Outstanding Lecturer (Dosen Berprestasi), University of Brawijaya (2015)
