= Dwikora Cabinet =

21st Indonesian cabinet

Dwikora Cabinet Kabinet Dwikora
- 23rd Cabinet of Indonesia
- 1964–1966
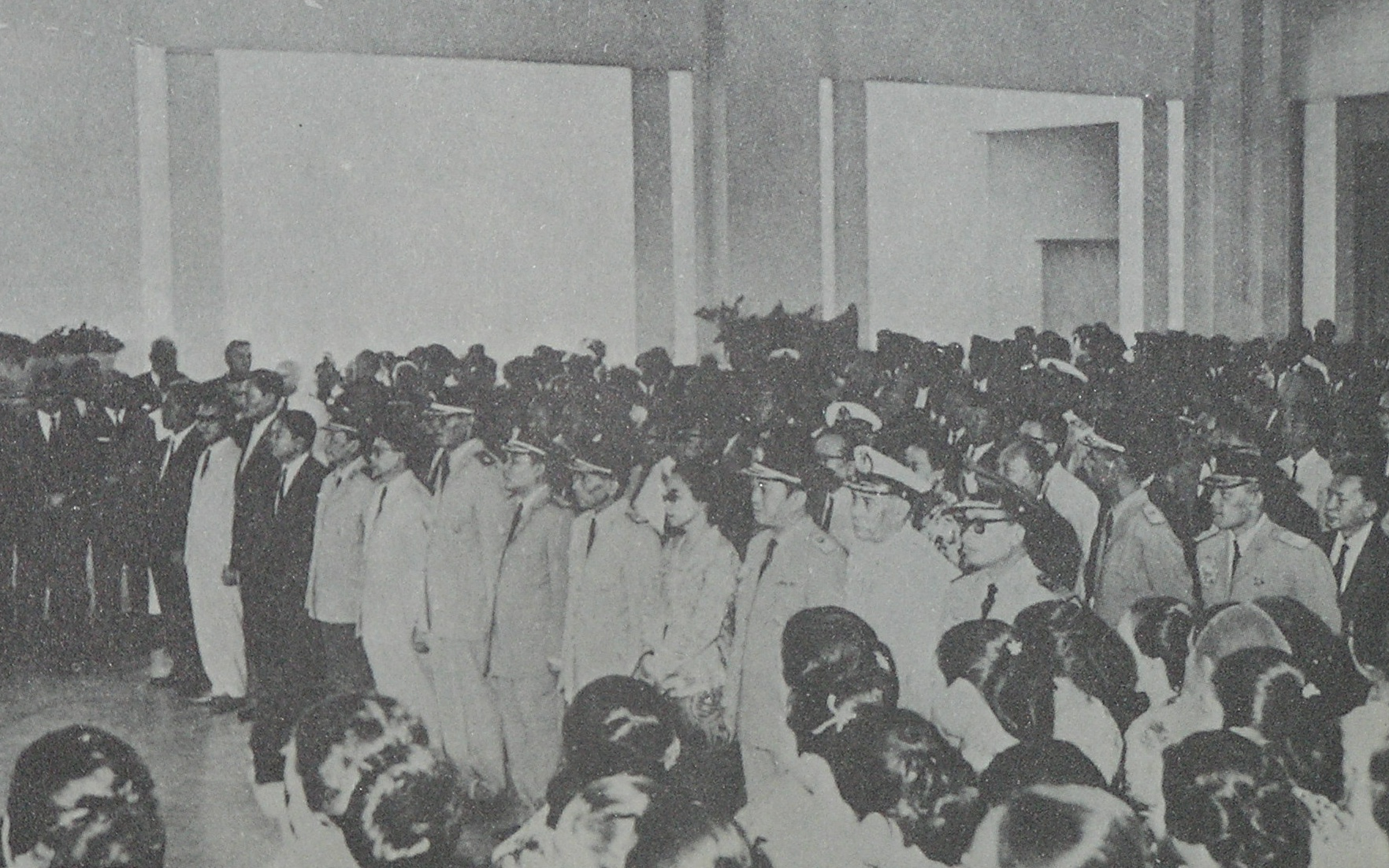
- Date formed: 2 September 1964
- Date dissolved: 21 February 1966

People and organisations
- President: Sukarno
- Prime Minister: Sukarno
- Deputy Prime Minister: Subandrio; Johannes Leimena; Chaerul Saleh
- No. of ministers: 104 ministers

History
- Predecessor: Working IV Cabinet
- Successor: Dwikora II Cabinet

The Dwikora Cabinet (Indonesian: Kabinet Dwikora) was the 23rd Indonesian cabinet. President Sukarno reshuffled the previous cabinet on 27 August 1964 to produce a cabinet better able to implement the government policy he had announced in his Independence Day speech entitled "The Year of Living Dangerously". The cabinet was appointed on 2 September and served for a year and five months before being reshuffled on 21 February 1966.

== Composition ==
=== Cabinet Leadership ===
- President/Prime Minister/Supreme Commander of Indonesian National Armed Forces/Mandatary of the Provisional People's Consultative Assembly (MPRS)/Great Leader of the Revolution: Sukarno

=== Presidium ===
- First Deputy Prime Minister: Subandrio
- Second Deputy Prime Minister: Johannes Leimena
- Third Deputy Prime Minister: Chairul Saleh

=== State Ministers Assigned to the Presidium ===
- State Minister: Oei Tjoe Tat
- State Minister: Njoto
- State Minister: Arifin Harahap
- State Minister: Police Brig. Gen. Mudjoko
- State Minister: Police Comm. Boegie Soepeno
- State Minister: Brig. Gen. Sukendro
- State Minister: Air Vice Marshal Sri Muljono Herlambang
- State Minister: Ibnu Sutowo
- State Minister: Aminuddin Azis

=== Ministers with the Status of Coordinating Ministers ===
- Minister of National Development Planning: Suharto
- Minister/Chairman of the Supreme Audit Agency: Sultan Hamengkubuwono IX

=== Foreign and Foreign Economic Relations Section ===
- Coordinating Minister: Subandrio
- Minister of Foreign Affairs and Foreign Economic Relations: Subandrio

=== Justice and Home Affairs Section ===
- Coordinating Minister: Wirjono Prodjodikoro
- Minister of Home Affairs: Sumarno Sosroatmodjo
- Minister of Justice: Achmad Astrawinata
- Minister/Chief Justice of the Supreme Court of Indonesia: Wirjono Prodjodikoro
- Minister/Attorney General: Brig. Gen. Sutardhio

=== Defense and Security Section ===
- Coordinating Minister/Chief-of-Staff of the Armed Forces: Gen. Abdul Haris Nasution
- Minister/Commander of the Army: Maj. Gen. Ahmad Yani (died in office as a result of the 30 September Movement coup attempt, October 1,1965)
- Minister/Commander of the Navy: Rear Admiral R. E. Martadinata
- Minister/Commander of the Air Force: Air Marshal Omar Dani (forced to resign as a result of the 30 September Movement coup attempt, November 27,1965)
- Minister/Chief of the National Police: Insp. Gen. Soetjipto Danoekoesoemo

=== Finance Section ===
- Coordinating Minister: Sumarno
- Minister of revenue, financing and supervision: H. Moh Hasan
- Minister of State Revenue: Police Brig. Gen. Hugeng Imam Santoso
- Minister of State Budget Affairs: Surjadi
- Minister of Central Bank Affairs: Jusuf Muda Dalam
- Minister of Insurance: Sutjipto S. Amidharmo

=== Development Section ===
- Coordinating Minister: Chairul Saleh
- Minister of Labor: Sutomo Martopradoto
- Minister of National Research: Soedjono Djuned Pusponegoro
- Minister of Public Works and Power: Maj. Gen. Suprajogi
- Minister of People's Industry: Maj. Gen. Azis Saleh
- Minister of Veterans' Affairs and Demobilization: Maj. Gen. Sarbini
- Minister of Basic Industries and Mining: Chairul Saleh
- State Minister Assigned to the Development Section: Ahem Erningpradja

=== Agriculture and Agrarian Affairs Section ===
- Coordinating Minister: Sadjarwo Djarwonagoro
- Minister of Agriculture: Sadjarwo Djarwonagoro
- Minister of Plantations: Frans Seda
- Minister of Forestry: Sudjarwo
- Minister of Fisheries: Commodore Hamzah Atmohandojo
- Minister of Agrarian Affairs: Rudolf Hermanses
- Minister of the Development of Villagers: Ipik Gandamana

=== Distribution Section ===
- Coordinating Minister: Johannes Leimena
- Minister of Trade: Adam Malik
- Minister of Land Transportation and Post, Telecommunications and Tourism: Lt. Gen. Hidajat
- Minister of Maritime Transportation: Brig. Gen. Ali Sadikin
- Minister of Air Transportation: Col. (AF) R. Iskandar
- Minister of Transmigration/ Cooperatives: Achadi

=== Welfare Section ===
- Coordinating Minister: Muljadi Djojomartono
- Minister of Religious Affairs: Sjaifuddin Zuchri
- Minister of Social Affairs: Rusiah Sardjono
- Minister of Health: Maj. Gen. Dr. Satrio
- Minister of Relations with Religious Scholars: Fatah Jasin

=== Education/Culture Section ===
- Coordinating Minister : Prijono
- Minister of Basic Education & Culture: Artati Marzuki Sudirdjo
- Minister of Higher Education & Science: Brig. Gen. Sjarif Thajeb
- Minister of Sport: Maladi

=== Relations with the People Section ===
- Coordinating Minister: Ruslan Abdulgani
- Minister of Information: Maj. Gen. Achmadi
- Minister of Relations with the People's Representative Council/People's Consultative Assembly/Supreme Advisory Council/National Planning Agency: W. J. Rumambi
- Minister/Secretary General of the National Front: Sudibjo

=== Presidential Advisory State Ministers ===
- Presidential/Prime Ministerial Advisory Minister of Funds and Forces: Notohamiiprodjo
- State Minister Assigned to the President: Iwa Kusumasumantri
- Minister and Military Adviser to the Indonesian President: ACM S. Surjadarma
- Domestic Security Adviser to the Indonesian President: Police Gen. Sukarno Djojonegoro

=== Officials with the Status of Coordinating Ministers ===
- Speaker of the People's Representative Council: Arudji Kartawinata
- First Deputy Chairman of the Supreme Advisory Council: Sartono
- Deputy Chairman of the Provisional People's Consultative Assembly: Ali Sastroamidjojo
- Deputy Chairman of the Provisional People's Consultative Assembly: Idham Chalid
- Deputy Chairman of the Provisional People's Consultative Assembly: Dipa Nusantara Aidit (died in office 22 November 1965)
- Deputy Chairman of the Provisional People's Consultative Assembly: Brig. Gen. Wilujo Puspojudo

=== Officials with Ministerial status ===
- State Secretary: Mohammad Ichsan
- Cabinet Presidium Secretary: Abdul Wahab Surjoadiningrat
- Second Deputy Chairman of the Supreme Advisory Council : prof. Sujono Hadinoto S.H.
- Deputy Speaker of the Mutual Assistance People's Representative Council:I Gusti Gde Subamia
- Deputy Speaker of the Mutual Assistance People's Representative Council: M. H. Lukman
- Deputy Speaker of the Mutual Assistance People's Representative Council: Mursalin Daeng Mamangung
- Deputy Speaker of the Mutual Assistance People's Representative Council: Achmad Sjaichu

== Cabinet reshuffling changes ==
As a result of the aftermath of the 30 September Movement coup attempt of 1965 in which Minister/Commander of the Army Ahmad Yani died along with 5 other top Army general officers, Sukarno appointed Maj. Gen. Pranoto Reksosamodra to the by then vacant post of Minister/Commander of the Army on 3 October 1965. His term ended on 14 October the same year, when Maj. Gen. Suharto, then the commander of Kostrad, was appointed to the post with effect the same day.

On 27 November, Air Marshal Omar Dani, due to pressure from many in the armed forces for his role in the coup attempt, resigned. His post as Minister/Commander of the Air Force was taken over by Air Vice Marshal Sri Mulyono Herlambang who was appointed to succeed him the same day.
