= Second Revised Dwikora Cabinet =

25th cabinet of Indonesia in 1966

Second Revised Dwikora Cabinet Kabinet Dwikora Yang Disempurnakan Lagi
- 25th Cabinet of Indonesia
- 1966
- Date formed: 30 March 1966
- Date dissolved: 25 July 1966
- President: Sukarno
- No. of ministers: 102 ministers

History
- Predecessor: Dwikora II Cabinet
- Successor: Ampera I Cabinet

The Second Revised Dwikora Cabinet (Indonesian: Kabinet Dwikora Yang Disempurnakan Lagi) was the Indonesian cabinet which served under President Sukarno from March 1966 until July 1966. The cabinet was formed after Lieutenant General Suharto, using the powers that Sukarno gave to him through Supersemar, arrested 15 ministers from the Revised Dwikora Cabinet who were suspected of being sympathizers of the Indonesian Communist Party (PKI).

== President ==
- President/Prime Minister/Supreme Commander-in-Chief of the Armed Forces/Mandatory of the Provisional People's Consultative Assembly (MPRS)/Great Leader of the Revolution: Sukarno

== Office of the President ==
- Deputy Prime Minister for General Affairs: Johannes Leimena
- State Secretary: M. Ichsan
- Presidential Secretary for Special Affairs: Stefanus Munadjat Danusaputro
- Cabinet Secretary: Police Brig. Gen. Hugeng Imam Santoso
- Deputy State Secretary and Presidential Secretary: Djamin Ginting

== Ministers in the Field of Social and Political Affairs ==
- Deputy Prime Minister for Social and Political Affairs/Minister of Foreign Affairs: Adam Malik
- Assistant to the Deputy Prime Minister for Social and Political Affairs: Maj. Gen. Mursyid
- Minister of Home Affairs: Maj. Gen. Basuki Rachmat
- Minister of Village Community Development: Aminuddin Azis
- Minister of Agrarian Affairs: Rudolf Hermanses
- Minister of Transmigration: Rear Admiral Sujono Suparto
- Minister of Information: W. J. Rumambi
- Minister of Education and Culture: Sarino Mangunpranoto
- Minister of Primary Education: M. Said Reksohadiprodjo
- Minister of Higher Education: Mashuri Saleh
- Minister of Sports: Maladi
- Minister of Religious Affairs: Sjaifuddin Zuchri
- Minister of Hajj Affairs: Farid Mar'uf
- Assistant to the Minister of Religious Affairs for Communications with Ulamas: Marzuki Jatim
- Minister of Social Affairs: Muljadi Djojomartono
- Minister of Justice/Chief Justice of the Supreme Court: Wirjono Prodjodikoro
- Minister of Manpower: Police Col. Awaluddin Djamin
- Minister of Health: Maj. Gen. Dr. Satrio

== Ministers in the Field of Economics, Finance, and Development ==
- Deputy Prime Minister for Economics, Finance, and Development/Minister of Tourism: Hamengkubuwono IX
- Assistants to the Deputy Prime Minister for Economics, Finance, and Development: Maj. Gen. Ali Sadikin, Arifin Harahap, J. D. Massie, Brig. Gen. Ahmad Sukendro, and T. D. Pardede
- Minister of Trade: Brig. Gen. Ashari Danudirdjo
- Deputy Minister of Trade: Col. Abdurachman Prawirakusumah
- Minister of Business Cooperation: Brig. Gen. Achmad Tirtosudiro
- Minister of Finance: Sumarno
- Governor of the Central Bank: Radius Prawiro
- Minister of the National Budget: Hans Alexander Pandelaki
- Minister of Banking Restructuring and Investments: Brig. Gen. Suhardi
- Minister of Public Works and Energy: Sutami
- Minister of Electricity and Energy: Brig. Gen. Hartono Wirjodiprodjo
- Minister of Irrigations: P. C. Harjosudirjo
- Minister of Roads Infrastructure: Maj. Gen. Sudarto
- Minister of Housing and Development: David Gee Cheng
- Minister of Mines, Oil, and Natural Gas: Maj. Gen. Ibnu Sutowo
- Deputy Minister of Mines: Brig. Gen. R. Pirngadi
- Minister of Basic and Light Industries: Brig. Gen. M. Jusuf
- Deputy Minister of Light Industries: Rear Admiral Suharnoko Harbani
- Minister of Maritime Industries: Mardanus
- Minister of Aviation Industries: Air Commodore J. Salatun
- Minister of Textile Industries and Handicraft: Hadi Thayeb
- Deputy Minister of Textile Industries: Sjafiun
- Minister of Agriculture and Plantations: Frans Seda
- Minister of Forestry: Sudjarwo
- Minister of Fisheries: Rear Admiral Hamzah Atmohandojo
- Minister of Special Projects: Rear Admiral Makki Perdana Kusumah
- Minister of the Development of the Trans-Sumatra Highway: Slamet Bratanata
- Minister of Transportation: Rear Admiral Jatidjan
- Minister of Land Transportation: Brig. Gen. Utojo Utomo
- Minister of Sea Transportation: Commodore (Navy) Susatyo Mardi
- Minister of Air Transportation: Partono
- Deputy Minister of Post and Telecommunication: Sahala Hamonangan Simatupang

== Ministers in the Field of Defense and Security ==
- Deputy Prime Minister for Defense and Security/Commander of the Army: Lt. Gen. Suharto
- Commander of the Navy: Rear Admiral Muljadi
- Deputy Commander of the Navy: Maj. Gen. (Marine Corps) Hartono
- Commander of the Air Force: Air Commodore Rusmin Nurjadin
- Chief of the National Police: Police Gen. Sucipto Judodiharjo
- Minister of Veterans' Affairs and Demobilization: Maj. Gen. Sarbini
- Attorney General: Brig. Gen. Sugih Arto

== Ministers in the Field of Political Institutions ==
- Deputy Prime Minister for Political Institutions/Chairman of the Revolutionary Spirit Development Body: Ruslan Abdulgani
- Assistant to the Deputy Prime Minister for Political Institutions: Abdul Fattah Jasin
- Secretary General of the National Front/Deputy Speaker of the Mutual Assistance People's Representative Council (DPR-GR): Achmad Sjaichu
- Assistants to the Secretary General of the National Front: M. Djambek and Brig. Gen. Djamin Ginting
- Chairman of the National Research Agency (BALITBANG): Suhadi Reksowardojo
- Chairman of the National Development Planning Bureau (BAPPENAS): Soeharto Sastrosoeyoso
- Chairman of the National Nuclear Research Board (BATAN): G. A. Siwabessy

== Minister in the Field of Governing Bodies ==
- Deputy Prime Minister for Governing Bodies/Vice Chairman of the Provisional People's Consultative Assembly (MPRS): Idham Chalid
- Chairman of the MPRS/Chairman of the National Resilience Agency: Maj. Gen. Wilujo Puspojudo
- Vice Chairman of the MPRS: Ali Sastroamidjojo
- Members of the MPRS Advisory Body: Sartono and Sujono Hadinoto
- Speaker of the Mutual Cooperation People's Representative Council: Rear Admiral Mursalin Daeng Mamangung
- Depurty Speakers of the DPR-GR: Brig. Gen. Syarif Thayeb and Asmara Hadi
- Chairman of the State Supervision Body: Maj. Gen. Suprayogi
