= Rudolf Hermanses =

Indonesian politician (1921–1970)

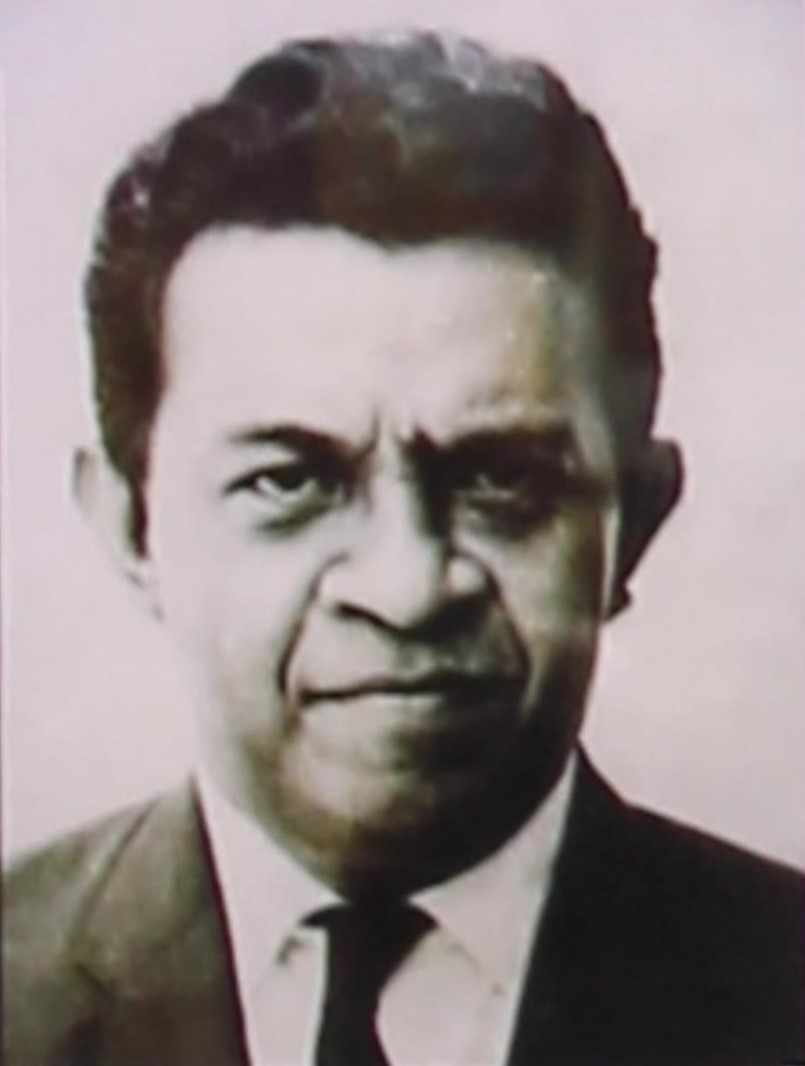

Minister of Agrarian Affairs
- In office 4 June 1964 – 25 July 1966
- President: Sukarno
- Preceded by: Sadjarwo Djarwonagoro
- Succeeded by: Suyono Suparto (as Director General of Agrarian Affairs); Soni Harsono

Personal details
- Born: September 1, 1921 Hulu Siau, Sangihe, Dutch East Indies
- Died: June 1, 1970 (aged 48) Jakarta, Indonesia
- Education: University of Indonesia (S.H.)

Rudolf Hermanses (1 September 1921 – 1 June 1970) was a bureaucrat from Indonesia. He served as the minister of agrarian affairs from 1964 until 1966.

Rudolf Hermanses was born at the Sangihe Islands on 1 September 1921. He studied law at the University of Indonesia and graduated in 1954. He was the assistant to the minister of agrarian affairs before being appointed as the minister of agrarian affairs on 4 Juni 1964 in a reshuffle of the Dwikora Cabinet. He retained his office in the second and third Dwikora Cabinet. He served until 25 July 1966. He died on 1 June 1970 in Jakarta and was buried at the Kalibata Heroes' Cemetery.

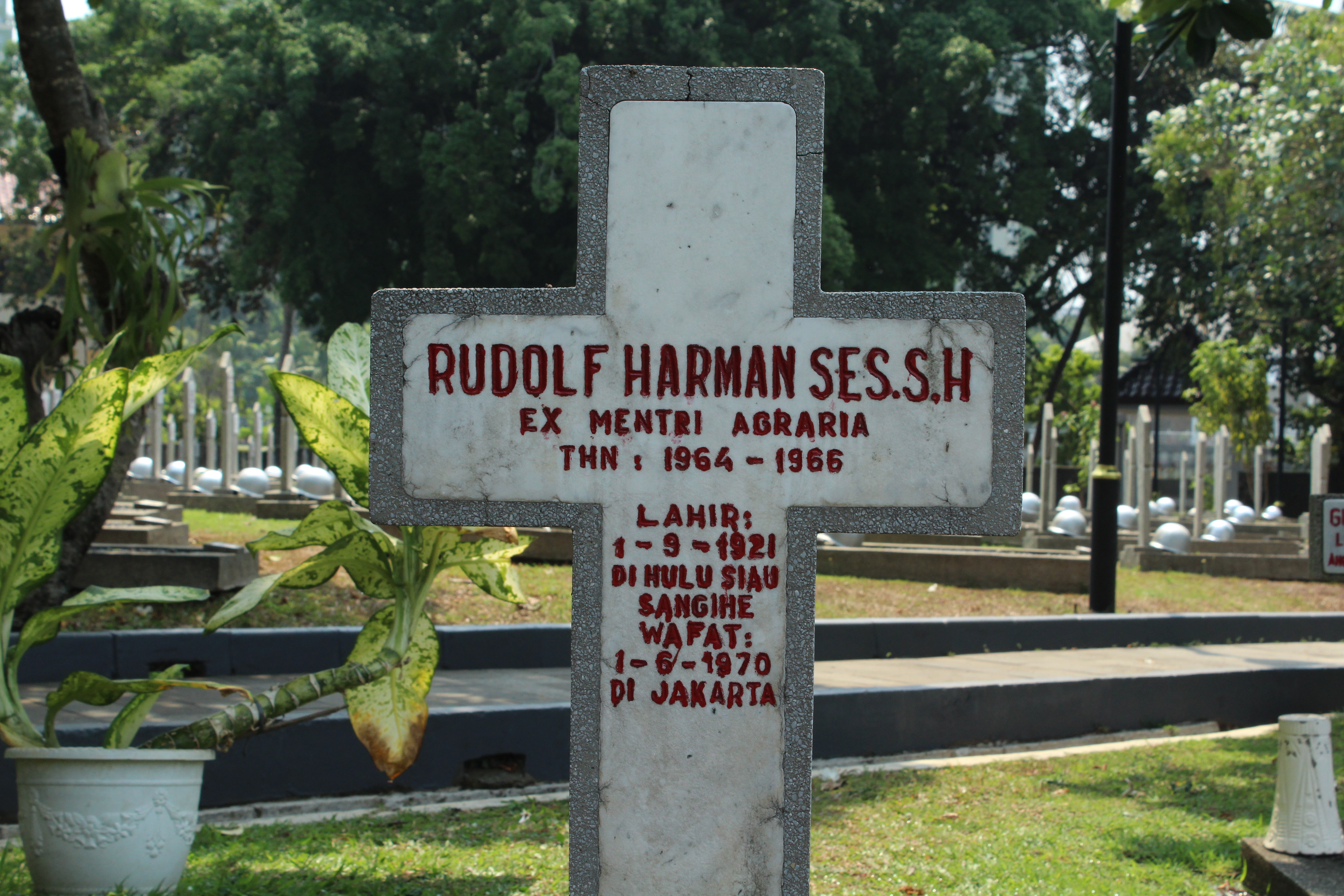
Rudolf Hermanses's grave at the Kalibata Heroes' Cemetery.
