= Juliari Batubara =

Indonesian politician

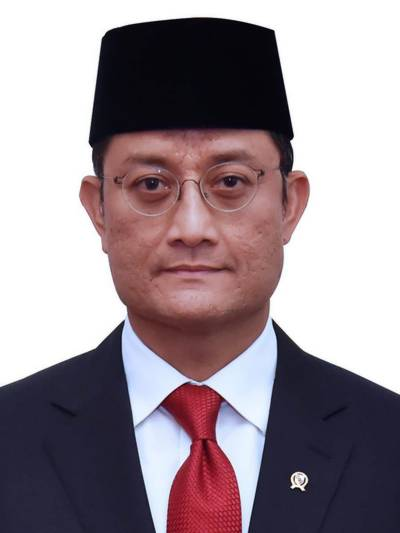

30th Minister of Social Affairs
- In office 23 October 2019 – 6 December 2020
- President: Joko Widodo
- Vice President: Ma'ruf Amin
- Preceded by: Agus Gumiwang Kartasasmita
- Succeeded by: Tri Rismaharini

Personal details
- Born: Juliari Peter Batubara; 22 July 1972 (age 53) Jakarta, Indonesia
- Party: PDI-P
- Spouse: Grace Batubara

Juliari Peter Batubara (born 22 July 1972) is an Indonesian politician, who served as Minister of Social Affairs in the 41st Cabinet of Indonesia from 23 October 2019 until his arrest in December 2020 for alleged corruption. He is a member of the Indonesian Democratic Party of Struggle (PDI-P).

== Education and business career ==
- SD St Franciscus ASISI Tebet Jakarta, 1979–1985
- SMP St Franciscus ASISI Tebet Jakarta, 1985–1988
- SMAN 8 Tebet Jakarta, 1988–1991
- Riverside City College, United States, 1991–1995
- Business Administration degree with minor in Finance, Chapman University, United States, 1995–1997

=== Business career ===
- President commissioner of PT Tridaya Mandiri, 2005.
- President director of PT Bwana Energy, 2004.
- President director of PT Arlinto Perkasa Buana, 2003.
- President director of PT Wiraswasta Gemilang Indonesia, 2003–2012.
- Commercial Division of PT Wiraswasta Gemilang Indonesia, 2002–2003.
- Marketing Supervisor of PT Wiraswasta Gemilang Indonesia, 1998–2002.

== Political career ==
Before entering politics, Juliari's business career involved companies such as PT Wiraswasta Gemilang Indonesia, PT Arlinto Perkasa Buana, PT Bwana Energy, and PT Tridaya Mandiri.

In 2014, he became a member of the People's Representative Council, representing Central Java for the Indonesian Democratic Party of Struggle. He joined the national parliament's Commission VI, which handles trade, industrial, investment and business affairs.

In October 2019, he was appointed Minister of Social Affairs by Indonesian President Joko Widodo. In December 2020, Widodo appointed Coordinating Minister for Human Development and Culture Muhadjir Effendy as acting social affairs minister, following Juliari's arrest for alleged corruption.

== Corruption case ==
On 6 December 2020, Juliari was arrested in Jakarta for allegedly receiving bribes from suppliers of social assistance during the COVID-19 pandemic. Indonesia's Corruption Eradication Commission (KPK) alleged that Juliari received up to IDR 17 billion in bribes. Later investigation revealred that the exact amount of bribes was IDR 32,482 billion. KPK chairman Firli Bahuri said Juliari is accused of receiving the bribes from two supplier companies via his two subordinates, Matheus Joko Santoso and Adi Wahyono, who were also named suspects.

He said the suppliers had been asked to pay a commission fee of IDR 10,000, for Juliari, for each package of basic food worth IDR 300,000 distributed to the needy during economic hardships due to the pandemic crisis. Due to the severity of his alleged crime, Juliari could face life imprisonment or the death penalty if convicted.

On 23 August 2021 he was sentenced to 12 years of prison and fined IDR 500 million. He also had to pay IDR 14.5 billion in compensation and was barred from holding any government position for 4 years

On 20 August 2023 Juliari alongside other criminals was granted reduced prison time in celebration of Indonesia Independence Day, the reduction that he got was 4 months.
