= Suhadi Reksowardojo =

Indonesian academicIan

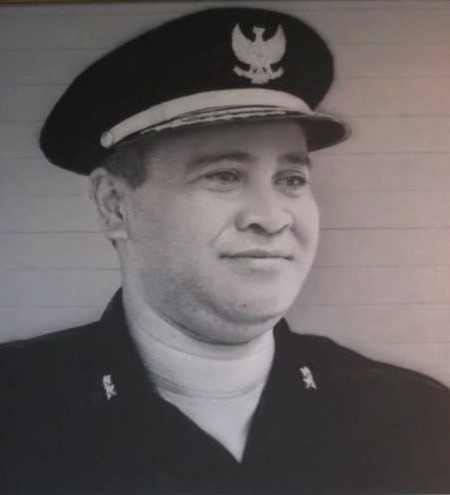

2nd Minister for National Research Agency
- In office 24 February 1966 – 25 July 1966
- President: Sukarno
- Prime Minister: Sukarno
- Preceded by: Sudjono Djuned Pusponegoro (Note: As Minister of National Research)
- Succeeded by: Sumitro Djojohadikusumo (1973) (Note: As State Minister for Research)

Personal details
- Born: 29 July 1923 Salatiga, Dutch East Indies
- Died: 26 July 1990 (aged 66) Yogyakarta, Indonesia
- Education: Bandung Kogyo Daigaku; University of Indonesia

Suhadi Reksowardojo (29 July 1923 – 26 July 1990) was an Indonesian academic. He also briefly served as Minister for National Research between February and July 1966.

== Biography ==
Suhadi was born in Salatiga on 29 July 1923, and he studied chemical engineering during the Japanese occupation of the Dutch East Indies at the Bandung Kogyo Daigaku. He completed his initial diploma in 1948, when the school had moved to Yogyakarta owing to the Indonesian National Revolution. During the revolution itself, Suhadi paused his studies, and took part in the nationalist cause, helping in the seizure of several production plants in West Java. After the war, he continued his studies at the University of Indonesia, obtaining his bachelor's degree in chemical engineering in 1957. He then began teaching chemical engineering there, before taking part in the founding of the Bandung Institute of Technology (ITB) in 1958.

He formulated the Tri Soko Guru in 1962, a set of principles for education which later evolved into the Tri Dharma Perguruan Tinggi, still used by present-day universities in Indonesia. In the Revised Dwikora Cabinet, Suhadi was appointed as State Minister of National Research, and he maintained his position in the succeeding cabinet. He then headed the National Research Body (Lemrenas). He was also professor of chemical engineering at ITB.

He died on 26 July 1990 in Yogyakarta.
