= Nani Soedarsono =

Indonesian politician (1928–2019)

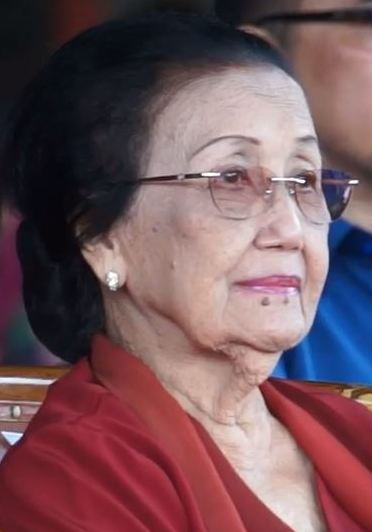
- Nani Soedarsono on 2016

20th Minister of Social Welfare
- In office 19 March 1983 – 21 March 1988
- President: Soeharto
- Preceded by: Supardjo
- Succeeded by: Haryati Soebadio

Personal details
- Born: Narjati Soenario; March 28, 1928 Purwodadi, Grobogan, Hindia Belanda
- Died: February 16, 2019 (aged 90) Jakarta, Indonesia
- Party: Golkar
- Spouse: Soedarsono
- Children: 3
- Education: Universitas Gadjah Mada
- Awards: Satyalancana Dwidya Sistha
- Website: www.nanisoedarsono.com

Nani Soedarsono (28 March 1928 in Purwodadi – 16 February 2019 in Jakarta) was an Indonesian politician who served as Minister of Social Welfare between 1983 and 1988.
