= Muhammad Ilyas (politician) =

Indonesian diplomat (1911–1970)

7th Ministry of Religious Affairs (Indonesia)
- In office 12 August 1955 – 10 July 1959
- President: Sukarno
- Preceded by: Masjkur
- Succeeded by: K.H.M. Wahib Wahab

Personal details
- Born: November 23, 1911 Kraksaan, Probolinggo, East Java, Indonesia
- Died: December 5, 1970 (aged 59) Jakarta, Indonesia

Muhammad Ilyas (November 23, 1911, Kraksaan, Probolinggo, East Java, Indonesia – December 5, 1970, Jakarta, Indonesia, at the age of 59) was the Minister of Religious Affairs in 1955–1959 in the Burhanuddin Harahap Cabinet, Second Ali Sastroamidjojo Cabinet, and the Djuanda Cabinet in the reign of the first Indonesian president Sukarno. He also served as Indonesian ambassador to Saudi Arabia for six years, from 1959.

KH Muhammad Ilyas is the in-law of Muhammad Maftuh Basyuni, Minister of Religious Affairs in the United Indonesia Cabinet from 2004–2009.

In 1969, he led the Indonesian delegation following a Summit, which was attended by 26 Islamic countries in Rabat, Morocco which discussed the Palestine-Israel conflict.
