= Idrus Marham =

Indonesian politician

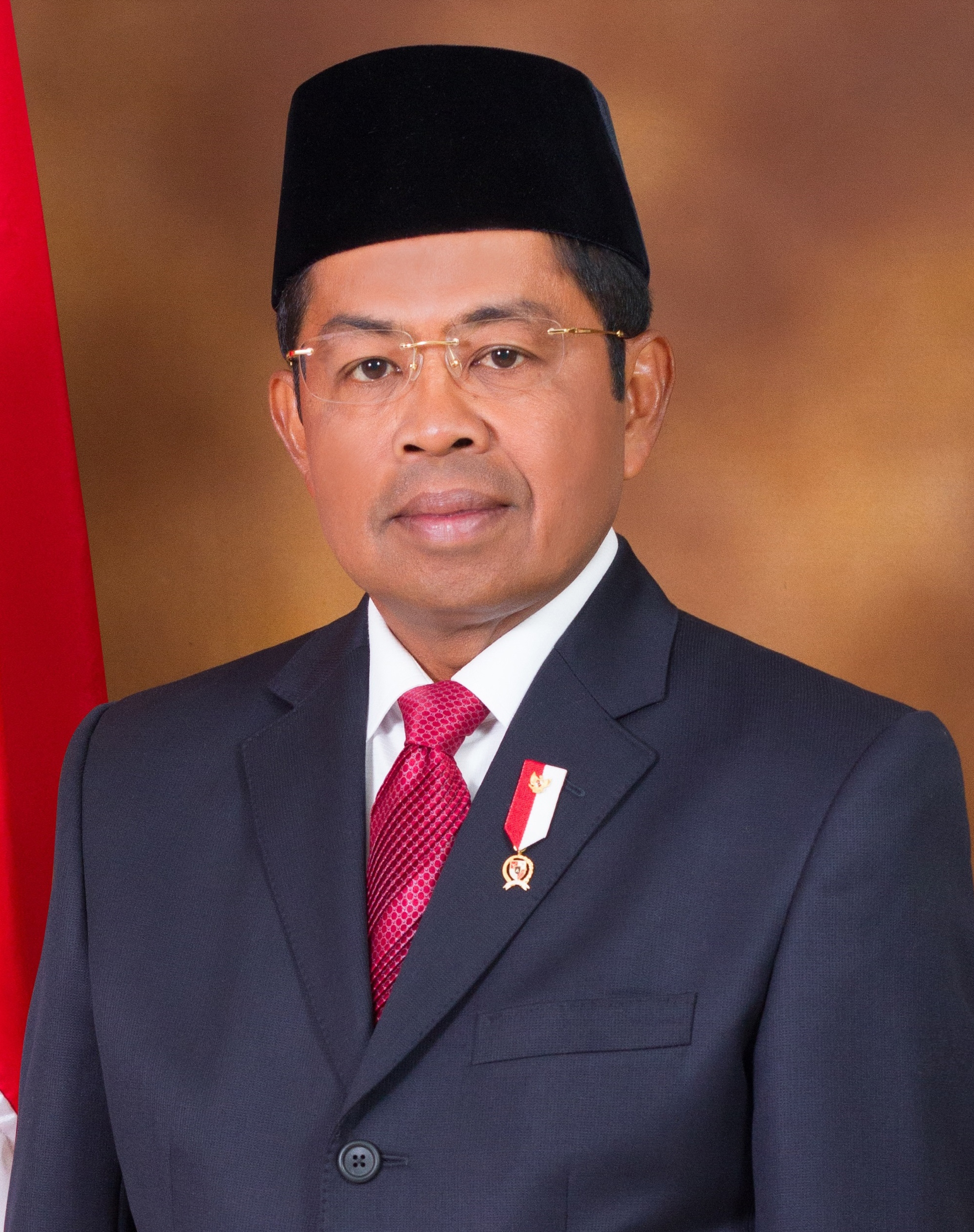

Minister of Social Affairs
- In office 17 January 2018 – 24 August 2018
- President: Joko Widodo
- Vice President: Jusuf Kalla
- Preceded by: Khofifah Indar Parawansa
- Succeeded by: Agus Gumiwang Kartasasmita

Secretary General of Golkar
- In office 9 October 2008 – 22 January 2018
- Preceded by: Sumarsono
- Succeeded by: Lodewijk Friedrich Paulus

Personal details
- Born: Muhammad Idrus Marham; 14 August 1962 (age 64) Patampauna, Indonesia
- Party: Golkar
- Spouse: Ridho Ekasari
- Children: 3
- Education: Gadjah Mada University

Idrus Marham is an Indonesian politician who served as social affairs minister under President Joko Widodo for seven months in 2018 before resigning because of a corruption scandal. He was jailed in 2019 for taking bribes from a businessman via a legislator to finance his failed bid to become chairman of Golkar Party. He was released from jail in September 2020. Prior to his political career, Idrus was a lecturer at various universities in Jakarta.

== Early life and education ==
Idrus was born in Pinrang, South Sulawesi. As a youth, he was involved in Karang Taruna youth organization and the Nahdlatul Ulama Students Association (IPNU).

After completing elementary school, Idrus attended State Religious Teacher Education (Pendidikan Guru Agama Negeri) vocational school in Pare-Pare. In junior high school, he joined the Intra-School Student Organization (OSIS). After completing high school in 1979, Idrus studied at the Syariah Faculty of the Alauddin State Institute of Islamic Studies in Makassar. In 1983, he studied at the Syariah Faculty of the Walisongo State Institute of Islamic Studies in Semarang. In 2009, Idrus received his doctorate in political science from Gadjah Mada University in Yogyakarta with a dissertation on "Half-Hearted Democracy; A Case Study of the Political Elite in the Indonesian Parliament of 1999–2004".

== Academic career ==
Idrus lectured at several universities in Jakarta, including Tarumanegara University, Attahiriyah Islamic University (UNIAT) Jakarta, and 17 Agustus 1945 University. He was also Assistant Rector III of UNIAT Jakarta from 1987 to 1992.

== Politics ==
Idrus became a member of the People's Consultative Assembly (MPR) in 1997, representing the nation's "youth" element. At that time, he was known as a mosque activist and had served as general chairman of the Indonesian Mosque Youth Communication Agency (BKPRMI).

In 2002, he became deputy coordinator for the Election-Winning Institute of Golkar Party's Central Executive Board. In the same year, at the age of 40, he became general chairman of the Central Executive Board of the Indonesian National Youth Committee (KNPI DPP) and deputy secretary general of Golkar's youth wing (AMPG). In 2003, he became a member of the advisory board of the Indonesian Youth Renewal Force (AMPI). In 2005, he became vice president of the World Assembly of Youth.

As a member of Golkar Party, Idrus was elected to the House of Representatives (DPR) for three consecutive terms: 1999–2004, 2004–2009 and 2009–2014, each time representing Electoral District III of South Sulawesi. In his final term in the legislature, he gained prominence as chairman of the DPR's special committee of inquiry into the Bank Century bailout controversy.

Under Golkar chairman Aburizal Bakrie, Idrus served as secretary general of the party for the 2009–2014 period. He was the first civilian to hold the position, which had always previously been held by figures with a military background. Idrus resigned from the DPR in June 2011 to focus on his role as Golkar secretary general.

At Golkar's national assembly in Denpasar, Bali, in December 2014, Idrus was re-elected as secretary general under Bakrie for the 2014–2019 period. Internal conflict in Golkar between Bakrie and rival politicians prompted the party to hold an Extraordinary National Deliberation (Munaslub) in Bali in May 2016. At the Munaslub, Setya Novanto was elected chairman, while Idrus maintained his position as secretary general. In June 2016, Idrus claimed Golkar's newly established executive committee was composed of "clean" members, who represented the principles of democracy, reconciliation, justice, constitutionality and honesty. Although Setya Novanto and several other members of the committee had been implicated in corruption cases, Idrus insisted their past legal cases were not an issue. "The Constitutional Court has said that anyone who had completed the legal process is entitled to political rights. Golkar adheres to that regulation, but how to approach the public, that is the struggle," he said.

During Indonesia's 2014 presidential election, Idrus was the coordinator of the Red and White Coalition (KMP) of parties supporting presidential contestant Prabowo Subianto, who lost the election to Joko Widodo. Under Bakrie's leadership, Golkar initially remained part of Prabowo's opposition coalition, but when Golkar came under the leadership of Setya Novanto in 2016, the party switched its allegiance to Jokowi. Idrus served as acting chairman of Golkar from November to December 2017, after Setya Novanto stepped down because of a corruption case involving electronic national identity cards.

== Social Affairs Minister ==
After Golkar switched its allegiance from Prabowo to Jokowi, the party was rewarded with cabinet positions. On 17 January 2018, Idrus Marham was appointed social minister, replacing Khofifah Indar Parawansa. He was apprehended by the Corruption Eradication Commission (KPK) in August 2018 on suspicion of receiving bribes in relation to a coal-fired power plant in Riau province.

== Corruption case and conviction ==
On 13 July 2018, the KPK arrested Golkar Party legislator Eni Maulani Saragih on suspicion of corruption involving Blackgold Natural Resources Limited receiving approval from the Indonesian parliament for construction of the Riau-1 coal-fired power plant project. Eni was arrested at Idrus's house, where she had been attending his son's birthday party. The following day, Idrus said he was shocked by her arrest. On 24 August 2018, Idrus was declared a suspect in the same case. The KPK arrested him on 31 August for allegedly using his influence as Golkar Party secretary general in the project. The KPK suspected Idrus received a pledge of $1.5 million from businessman Johannes Budisutrisno Kotjo if Samantaka Batubara company, a subsidiary of Blackgold, would receive a power purchase agreement deal from state electricity company PLN.

The KPK said former Golkar Party chairman Setya Novanto had ordered Eni, who was deputy head of the DPR's commission on energy, to help Blackgold and China Huadian Engineering Company Limited to win the power plant construction project, valued at around US$900 million. However, after Setya was named a suspect in the national ID card corruption case, Eni reported to Idrus on the matter, as he was now acting chairman of Golkar. The KPK said Idrus and Eni had met with Kotjo at his office at Graha BIP building in Jakarta. Idrus was also said to have attended a meeting on the matter with PLN president director Sofyan Basir.

When Idrus went on trial on 15 January 2019, prosecutors said he had told Eni to ask Kotjo for a bribe of $2.5 million, ostensibly to be used for Golkar's Extraordinary National Congress (Munaslub) in December 2017. Prosecutors said Idrus wanted the money because he sought to replace Setya Novanto as Golkar chairman. The court heard that Kotjo gave Idrus Rp2 billion via Eni's colleague Tahta Maharaya, while Eni gave about Rp713 million of the money from Kotjo to Muhammad Sarmuji, deputy secretary of the steering committee of the Golkar congress.

On 23 April 2019, Jakarta Corruption Court convicted Idrus of corruption for receiving bribes in the Riau-1 power plant case. He was sentenced to three years in jail and fined Rp150 million. Presiding judge Yanto said Idrus received a bribe from Eni, who had received a Rp4.75 billion bribe from Kotjo. Prosecutors from the KPK had recommended Idrus be given a jail sentence of five years and a fine of Rp300 million.

Prosecutors appealed the three-year sentence as being too lenient. Jakarta High Court concurred and in July 2019 extended Idrus's sentence to five years in jail. Idrus then appealed to the Supreme Court, which in December 2019 announced it had cut his jail sentence to two years and his fine to Rp50 million. The three judges who cut the sentence were Suhadi, Krisna Harahap and Abdul Latief. They said that although Idrus had received a "gift", he had not been "the decisive element authorized to make the decision" to award the project to BlackGold Natural Resources.

Idrus was released from Jakarta's Cipinang jail on 11 September 2020.

== Personal life ==
On 4 June 2009, at the age of 47, Idrus married Ridho Ekasari (then aged 28), a former presenter for Metro TV. The wedding reception was held in Depok, West Java, at Dian al Makhri Mosque, better known as the Golden Dome Mosque. Present as a witness for Idrus was then-president Susilo Bambang Yudhoyono, while then-vice president Jusuf Kalla was a witness for Ridho. Idrus and Ridho had met when he presented a religious program on a commercial television network.
