= Iwa Koesoemasoemantri =

Indonesian politician

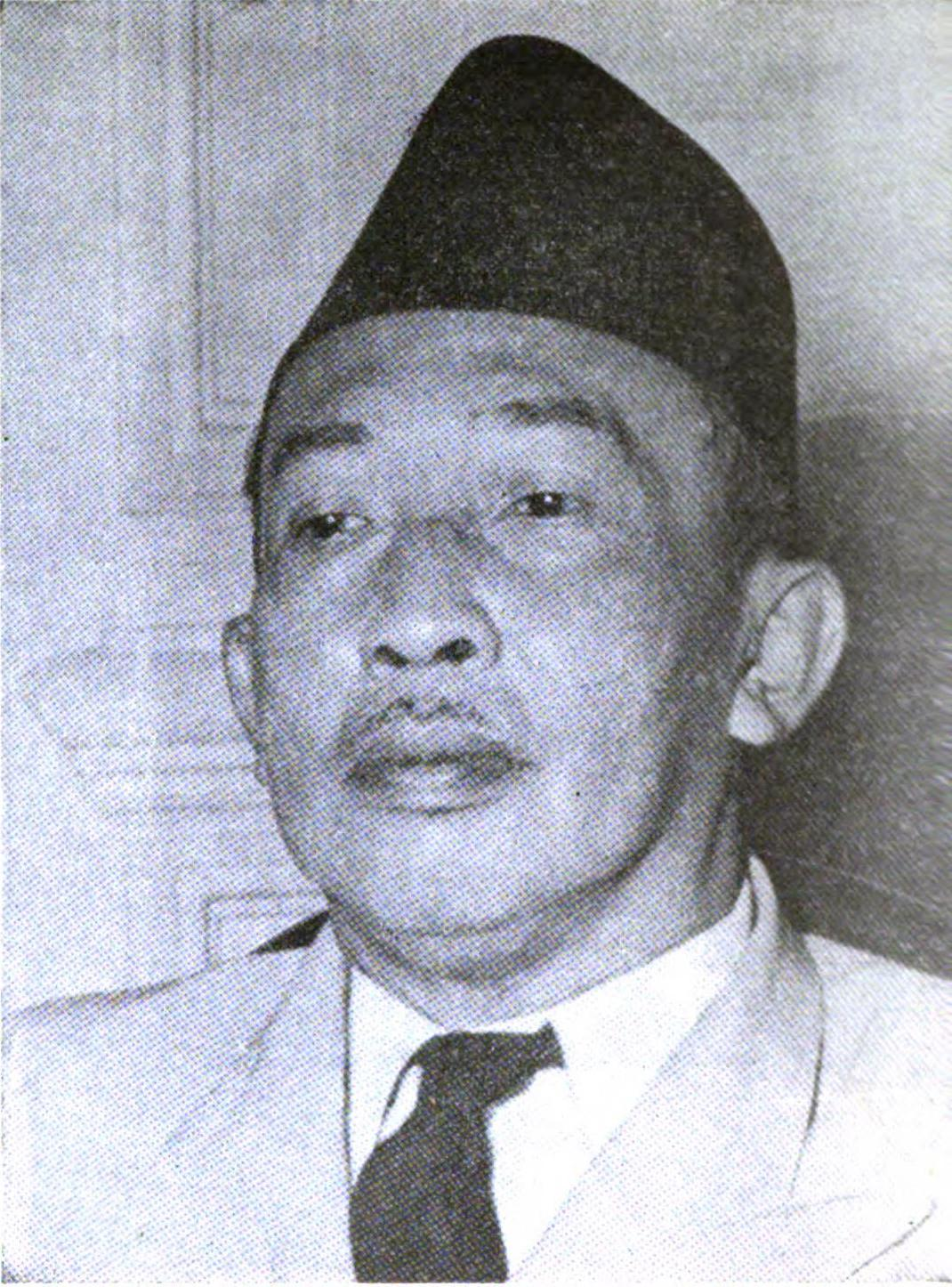
- Iwa Koesoemasoemantri in 1954

7th Minister of Defense
- In office 30 July 1953 – 12 August 1955
- President: Sukarno
- Prime Minister: Ali Sastroamidjojo
- Preceded by: Wilopo
- Succeeded by: Burhanuddin Harahap

1st Minister of Social Affairs
- In office 19 August 1945 – 14 November 1945
- President: Sukarno
- Preceded by: Office established
- Succeeded by: Adjidarmo Tjokronegoro

Personal details
- Born: 31 May 1899 Ciamis, Dutch East Indies
- Died: 27 November 1971 (aged 72) Jakarta, Indonesia
- Resting place: Karet Bivak Cemetery
- Party: Independent
- Other political affiliations: PNI (1927–1931); Murba Party (1948; honorary)
- Education: Leiden University
- Occupation: Politician; lawyer

Iwa Koesoemasoemantri (Perfected Spelling: Iwa Kusumasumantri; also Kusuma Sumantri; 31 May 1899 – 27 November 1971) was an Indonesian politician. Born in Ciamis, West Java, Iwa graduated from legal school in the Dutch East Indies (now Indonesia) and Netherlands before spending time at a school in the Soviet Union. After returning to Indonesia he established himself as a lawyer, nationalist, and, later, a figure for workers' rights. During the first twenty years of Indonesia's independence Iwa held several cabinet positions. After retiring he continued to write. In 2002 Iwa was declared a National Hero of Indonesia.

== Early life ==
Iwa was born in Ciamis, West Java, on 31 May 1899. After completing his primary education in schools run by the Dutch colonial government, he left for Bandung, where he attended the School for Native Government Employees (Opleidingsschool Voor Inlandse Ambtenaren, or OSVIA). Unwilling to adapt the Western culture demanded at the school, he dropped out and moved to Batavia (now Jakarta) to attend the law school; while in the colonial capital he also became involved with Jong Java, an organisation for Javanese youth.

Iwa graduated in 1921 and continued his studies at the University of Leiden in the Netherlands. In the country he joined the Indonesian Association (Perhimpoenan Indonesia), a nationalist group of Indonesian intellectuals. He emphasised that Indonesians should work together, regardless of race, creed, or class, to ensure independence from the Dutch; he preached non-cooperation with colonial forces. In 1925 he moved to the Soviet Union to spend a year and a half studying at the Communist University of the Toilers of the East in Moscow. In the Soviet Union he was briefly married to a Ukrainian woman named Anna Ivanova; the two had a daughter, Sumira Dingli, together.

Upon returning to the Indies in 1927, Iwa joined the Indonesian National Party and worked as a lawyer. He later moved to Medan, in northern Sumatra, where he established the newspaper Matahari Terbit; the newspaper advocated workers rights and criticised the area's large Dutch-owned plantations. For these writings, and following an attempt to organise a labour union, in 1929 Iwa was arrested by Dutch colonial authorities and spent a year in jail before being exiled to Banda Neira, in the Banda Islands, for a period of ten years.

While in Banda Iwa became a devout Muslim, although he continued to believe in the value of Marxism. He also met several leading nationalist figures also there in exiled, including Muhammad Hatta, Sutan Sjahrir, and Tjipto Mangunkusumo. Iwa later returned to Batavia and, during the Japanese occupation (1942–45) operated a law firm there. He also gave several lectures on the nationalist causes, under the watchful eye of the Japanese occupational forces.

== Post-independence ==
As Japan's defeat in the Pacific became increasingly evident, Indonesian nationalist leaders began preparing for independence. Iwa suggested the use of the term proclamation, which was eventually used, and helped draft the Constitution of Indonesia, Indonesia proclaimed its independence on 17 August 1945.

During the early months of the revolution which followed the proclamation, Iwa worked closely with the new, native, government. On 31 August he was selected as Minister of Social Affairs in the first cabinet under President Sukarno. He held the post until November 1945. He then joined the Struggle Union (Persatuan Perjuangan), led by Tan Malaka. He was accused of involvement with the 3 July Affair in 1946, which led to the Indonesian government imprisoning him; other prisoners included Muhammad Yamin, Achmad Soebardjo, and Tan Malaka.

The Dutch recognised Indonesia's independence in 1949, and in the new United States of Indonesia Iwa served as a member of the People's Representative Council until 1950. In 1953 Iwa was selected as Defence Minister for the First Ali Sastroamidjojo Cabinet, under Prime Minister Ali Sastroamidjojo; his term lasted until 1955. In 1957 Iwa became rector of Padjadjaran University in Bandung. His final political term, from 1963 to 1964, was as a government minister for the Fourth Working Cabinet.

After his retirement from politics Iwa wrote extensively, often about history. Works published in this period include Revolusi Hukum di Indonesia (Legal Revolution in Indonesia), Sejarah Revolusi Indonesia (History of the Indonesian Revolution; in three volumes) and Pokok-Pokok Ilmu Politik (Tenets of Politics). He died on 27 November 1971 in Jakarta and was buried at Karet Bivak Cemetery.

On 6 November 2002 Iwa was declared a National Hero of Indonesia. According to Indonesian historian Asvi Warman Adam, this was a prolapsed process owing to Iwa's affiliations with Tan Malaka and other communist interests, efforts not supported by the New Order government under President Suharto.

== Works cited ==
- Adam, Asvi Warman (2009). Membongkar Manipulasi Sejarah [Uncovering the Manipulation of History] (in Indonesian). Jakarta: Kompas. ISBN 978-979-709-404-1.
- Junaidi, Ahmad (1 August 2002). "Indonesia's constitutional history minefield of confusion". Archived from the original on 14 April 2014.
- Kahin, George McTurnan (1952). Nationalism and Revolution in Indonesia. Cornell University Press. ISBN 978-0-8014-9108-5.
- Mirnawati (2012). Kumpulan Pahlawan Indonesia Terlengkap [Most Complete Collection of Indonesian Heroes] (in Indonesian). Jakarta: CIF. ISBN 978-979-788-343-0.
- Sudarmanto, J. B. (2007). Jejak-Jejak Pahlawan: Perekat Kesatuan Bangsa Indonesia [Footsteps of the Heroes: Uniting the Indonesian People] (in Indonesian). Jakarta: Grasindo. ISBN 978-979-759-716-0.
- White, Ben (2005). "Between Apologia and Critical Discourse: Agrarian Transitions and Scholarly Engagement in Indonesia". In Hadiz, Vedi R.; Dhakidae, Daniel (eds.). Social Science and Power in Indonesia. Singapore: Institute of Southeast Asian Studies. pp. 107–42. ISBN 9789793780016.
