= Oei Tjoe Tat =

Chinese-Indonesian government official (1922–1996)

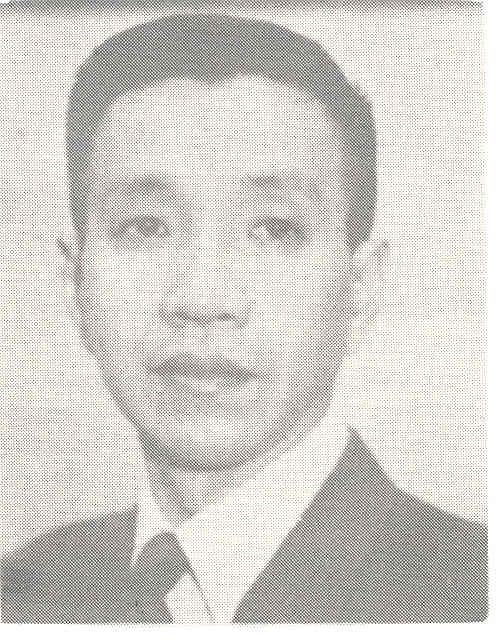

Minister of State
- In office 2 September 1964 – 21 February 1966
- President: Sukarno

Personal details
- Born: 26 April 1922 Surakarta, Central Java, Dutch East Indies
- Died: 26 May 1996 (aged 74) Jakarta, Indonesia
- Education: University of Indonesia

Oei Tjoe Tat (simplified Chinese: 黄自达; traditional Chinese: 黃自達; pinyin: Huáng Zì Dá; 26 April 1922 – 26 May 1996) was a Chinese-Indonesian government official. Born in Surakarta, Central Java, he began his political career after graduating from the Universiteit van Indonesië (now the University of Indonesia) in Batavia, Dutch East Indies (Now Jakarta) in 1948. He was elected vice president of the Chinese Indonesian Democratic Party (PDTI) in 1953, joined the Indonesian Citizenship Consultative Board (BAPERKI) in 1954 and was active in Indonesia Party (Partindo) beginning in 1960.

In 1963 he was appointed Minister of State and then he became one of the members of the Cabinet Dwikora 100. In 1965 he was detained by the New Order government of Suharto and imprisoned for 10 years without trial until 1976. In 1976 he was charged with involvement in the 30 September Movement of 1965, although the charge was never proven. He was released in 1977.

He later authored a memoir entitled Memoar Oei Tjoe Tat: Pembantu Presiden Sukarno (Memoirs of Oei Tjoe Tat: Assistant to President Sukarno), co-edited by Pramoedya A. Toer and Stanley A. Prasetyo. The most critical elements in the book include first-hand testimonies of what happened during the first few months of the 1965 killings in Java, Bali and Sumatra and of Suharto's restless behavior during those volatile months, and also testimonies from other eyewitnesses to the events. Some of the most sensitive materials in his book were derived from his position as a member of a fact-finding committee established by President Sukarno to examine the details and scope of the mass murders from October to December 1965. Oei had spent more than a decade in jail, where he further collected a wealth of first-hand testimonies of the contested history from other inmates. The memoir also addressed the assistance of the American government in the affair, especially in mobilizing student activists during the attacks against the Pro-Beijing government of Sukarno, his supporters, all leftist organizations, and the Chinese-Indonesian minority. A group of former student activists of 1966 who had belonged to the FOSKO 66 (Forum Studi dan Komunikasi, 'Forum of Study and Communication') launched a series of protests against the publication of the memoir, demanding that it be banned and its author tried. On September 25, 1995, the memoir was banned after 12,000 copies had already been sold in the first five months of its circulation.

Oei died in Jakarta in 1996.
