= Agus Gumiwang Kartasasmita =

Indonesian politician

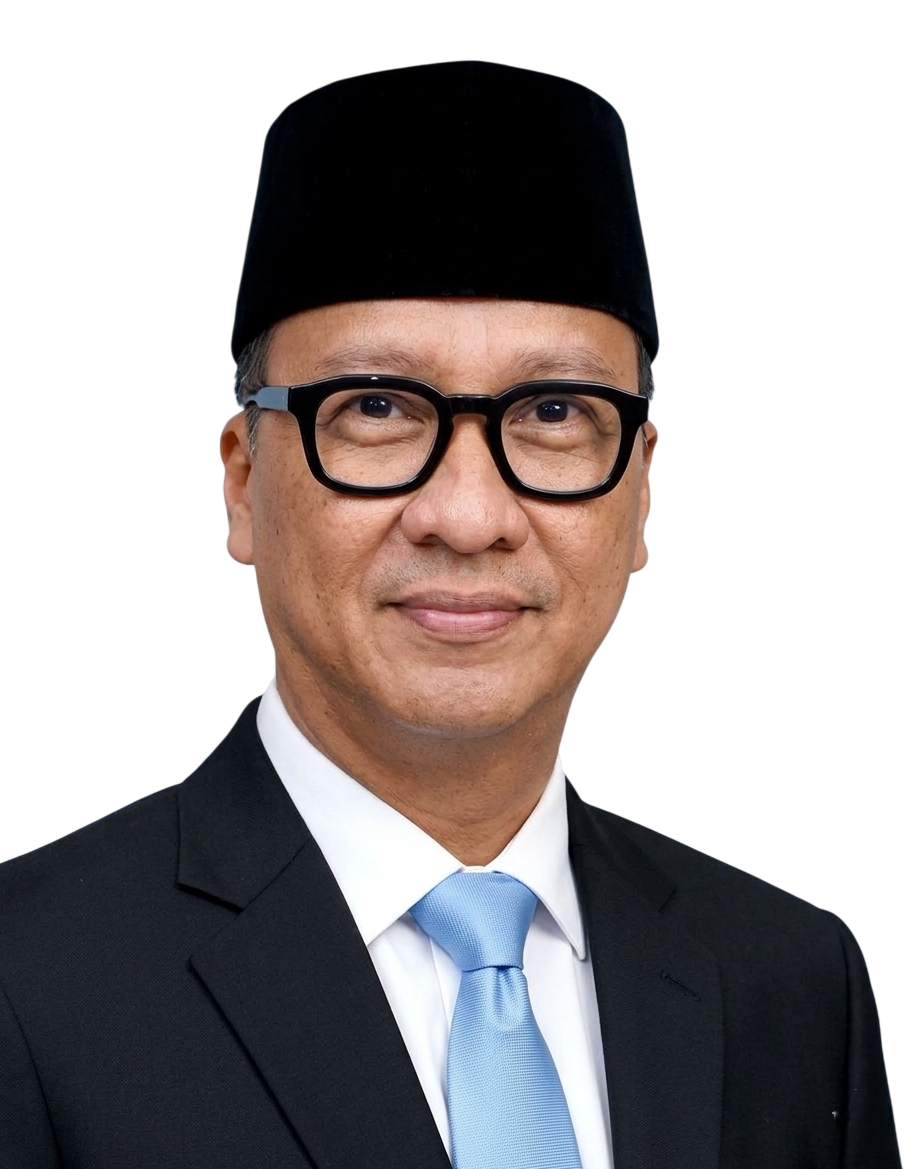
- Official portrait, 2024

25th Minister of Industry
- Incumbent
- Assumed office 23 October 2019
- President: Joko Widodo; Prabowo Subianto
- Deputy: Faisol Riza (2024–present)
- Preceded by: Airlangga Hartarto

General Chairman of Golkar
- Acting; 13 August 2024 – 19 August 2024
- Preceded by: Airlangga Hartarto
- Succeeded by: Bahlil Lahadalia

29th Minister of Social Affairs
- In office 24 August 2018 – 20 October 2019
- President: Joko Widodo
- Preceded by: Idrus Marham
- Succeeded by: Juliari Batubara

Member of the House of Representatives
- In office 1 October 2009 – 24 August 2018
- Succeeded by: Agus Makmur Santoso
- Constituency: West Java II
- In office 1998 – 30 September 2004

Personal details
- Born: 3 January 1969 (age 57) Jakarta, Indonesia
- Party: Golkar
- Spouse: Loemongga Haoemasan (m. 1998)
- Children: Ghaniya Kartasasmita; Ghaziya Kartasasmita; Ghibran Kartasasmita; Gemma Zuleykha Kartasasmita
- Parents: Ginandjar Kartasasmita (father); Yultin Harlotina (mother)
- Education: Pacific Western University; University of Pasundan

Agus Gumiwang Kartasasmita (born 3 January 1969) is an Indonesian politician. He served as the Minister of Industry in the Republic of Indonesia from 2019 until 2026

== Early life, and education ==
Agus Kartasasmita was born on 3 January 1969 in Jakarta, Indonesia. His father is Ginandjar Kartasasmita a former Speaker of Indonesia Regional Representative Council. Kartasasmita attended Canisius High School in 1984 and left in 1985 to Knox High School in New York. In 1991, he wstudied Commercial Science at Pacific Western University and graduated in 1994 with a BSc in Commercial science. In 2007, he enrolled into University of Pasundan where he graduated with Master of Public Administration in 2009, and obtained a PhD in Administration in 2014.

== House of Representatives ==
=== First term (1998–2004) ===
Agus Kartasasmita began his political career when he was elected into the People's Representative Council of Indonesia in 1998 and served till 2004. While serving as member of parliament he was a member of Commission I of the Parliament.

=== Second term (2009–2014) ===
In 2009 he was re-elected into the Legislative Assembly, during his tenure he served as Chairman of the Working Committee of the State Intelligence Bill, International Treaties Committee Chairman Bill, Chairman of the Special Committee for National Security Bill and Vice Chairman of Commission I respectively until 2014.

=== Third term (2014–2018) ===
In 2014, he was re-elected into People's Representative Council of Indonesia. He is a member of the Commission XI of the House of Representative. In early 2015, he was appointed Secretary of Golkar Party faction in People's Representative Council.

== Ministerial career ==
=== Minister of Social Affairs ===
On 24 August 2018, he was appointed Minister of Social Affairs by President Joko Widodo.

=== Minister of Industry ===
On 23 October 2019, president elect Jokowi announced that Agus Gumiwang would make a return to his Indonesia Onward Cabinet as Minister of Industry replacing Gumiwang's fellow Golkar Party politician, Airlangga Hartarto.

== Honours ==
- Indonesia
  - Star of Mahaputera, (2nd Class) (Indonesian: Bintang Mahaputera Adipradana) (14 August 2024)
  - Star of Service, (1st Class) (Indonesian: Bintang Jasa Utama) (6 November 2020)
