= Fatah Jasin =

Indonesian politician

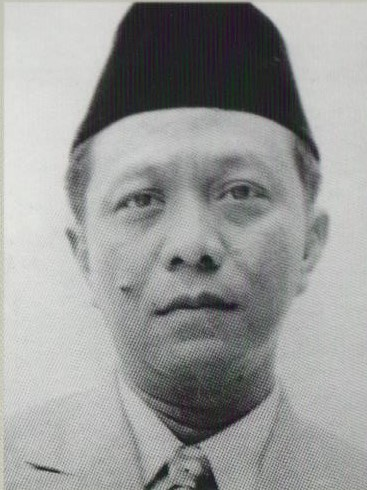

Minister of Social Affairs
- In office 24 March 1956 – 14 March 1957
- President: Sukarno
- Prime Minister: Ali Sastroamidjojo
- Preceded by: Soedibjo; Sutomo (acting)
- Succeeded by: Johannes Leimena

Minister of Religious Scholars Liaison
- In office 9 July 1959 – 1 October 1965
- Succeeded by: Muhammad Ilyas

Personal details
- Born: 26 June 1915 Surabaya, Dutch East Indies
- Died: 3 May 1980 (aged 64) Surabaya, East Java, Indonesia
- Party: Nahdlatul Ulama

Abdul Fattah Jasin or Fatah Jasin (26 June 1915 – 3 May 1980) was an Indonesian politician and Islamic cleric who served as Minister of Social Affairs during the Second Ali Sastroamidjojo Cabinet.

== Biography ==
=== Early career ===
Jasin was born in Surabaya on 26 June 1915 and received Islamic education in madrasa and pesantren. He was the son of a well-known ulama in Surabaya. After completing his education, he taught at a madrasa in Sampang before returning to Surabaya, where he taught at a madrasa affiliated with Nahdlatul Ulama. From 1939 until the Japanese takeover in 1942, he was a merchant in the city, and between 1938 and 1942 he was a member of the Gerindo political organization. Jasin was arrested and apparently sentenced to death during the Japanese occupation by the Japanese forces, but the surrender of Japan and the ensuing independence of Indonesia occurred before he could be executed.

=== Old Order ===
During the Indonesian National Revolution, he was for a time chief of political education in the Indonesian Navy and managed a cigarette factory. After the handover of sovereignty, Jasin became a city councillor in Surabaya and continued to work as a merchant. Within Nahdlatul Ulama (NU), he participated in the Ansor Youth Movement and the NU Farmers' Association. He took part in the 1955 legislative election and was elected to the People's Representative Council, but he became an inactive member when he was appointed minister, and less than a month after the swearing in he was replaced by another NU politician.

Initially, the Nahdlatul Ulama nominated Zainul Arifin as Minister of Social Affairs in the newly formed Second Ali Sastroamidjojo Cabinet. However, protestations from Masyumi resulted in Jasin being appointed instead. During the Guided Democracy period, Jasin served as a Minister for Liaison with Ulama, a position he would hold from the establishment of the Working Cabinet on 9 July 1959 to the initial reshuffle of the Dwikora Cabinet on 1 October 1965. He was assistant under coordinating or deputy prime ministers after the cabinet's reshuffle, until he no longer held a cabinet seat after the Ampera Cabinet was established.

=== Death ===
Jasin died in his home in Surabaya on 3 May 1980 and was buried in a public cemetery of the city on 4 May with a military funeral. At the time of his death, he had two wives and six children.
