= Bachtiar Chamsyah =

Indonesian politician (1945–2026)

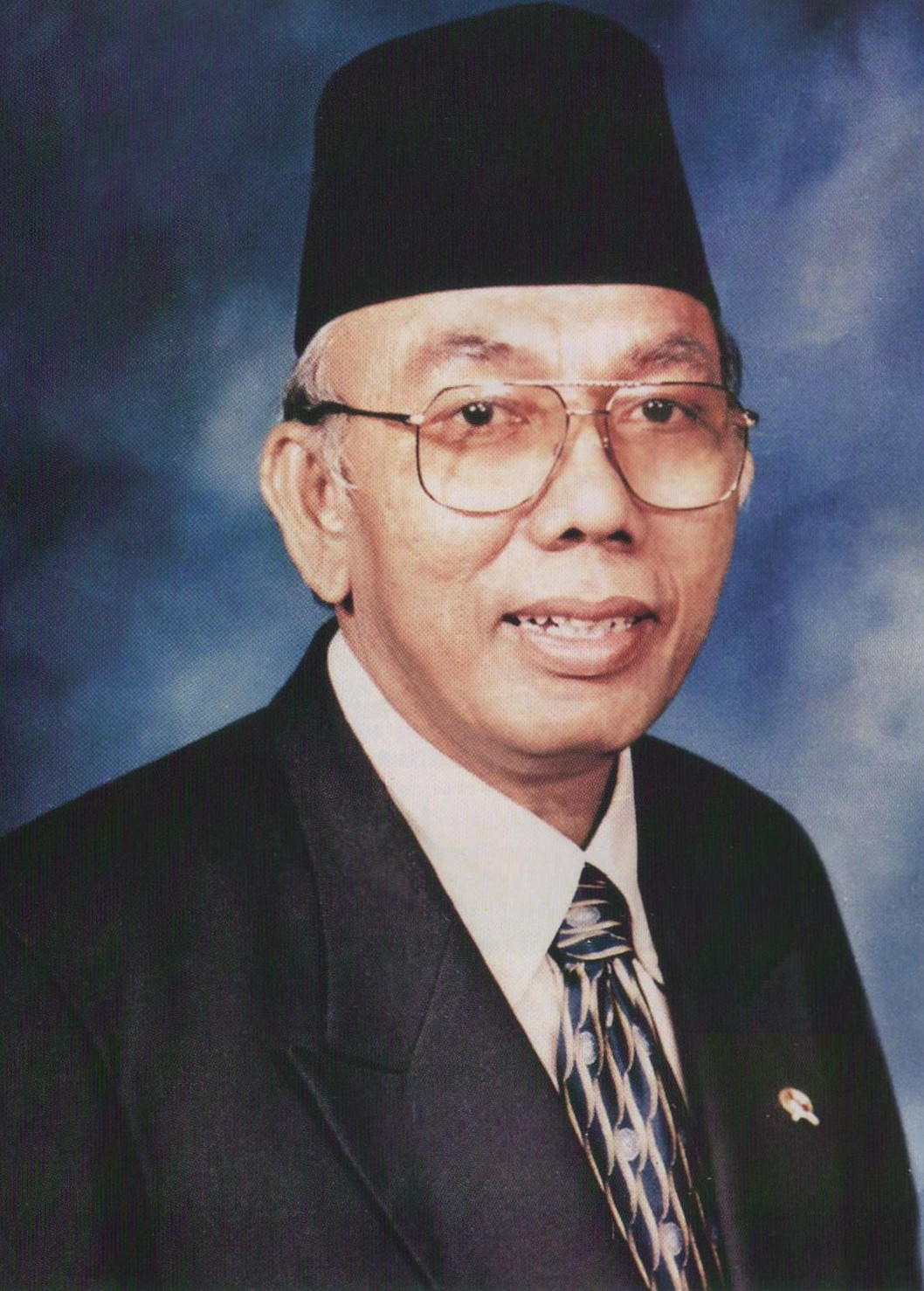

Bachtiar Chamsyah (31 December 1945 – 24 September 2026) was an Indonesian politician in the United Development Party (PPP) who was Minister of Social Affairs from 2001 to 2004 in Mutual Assistance Cabinet under Megawati. In 2004 he was reappointed again as Minister of Social Affairs in First United Indonesia Cabinet under Yudhoyono presidency. He gained bachelor's degree at Faculty of Economic, Medan Area University in Medan North Sumatra.

Chamsyah died on 24 September 2026, at the age of 80.

== Sources ==
- Tokohindonesia.com
