= Second Ali Sastroamidjojo Cabinet =

Second Ali Sastroamidjojo Cabinet Kabinet Ali Sastroamidjojo II
- 17th Cabinet of Indonesia
- 1956–1957
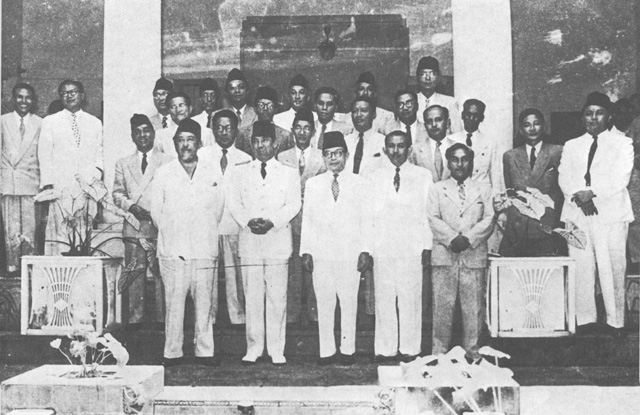
- Date formed: 24 March 1956
- Date dissolved: 9 April 1957

People and organisations
- Head of state: Sukarno
- Head of government: Ali Sastroamidjojo
- No. of ministers: 27 ministers
- Member party: PNI Masyumi; NU; PSII; Parkindo; Catholic Party; IPKI; PTI Independent
- Opposition party: PKI; PSI

History
- Predecessor: Burhanuddin Harahap Cabinet
- Successor: Djuanda Cabinet

The Second Ali Sastroamidjojo Cabinet (Indonesian: Kabinet Ali Sastroamidjojo II), also known as the Ali-Roem-Idham Cabinet (Indonesian: Kabinet Ali-Roem-Idham) was an Indonesian cabinet that was in office from 24 March 1956 until 9 April 1957.

== Composition ==
=== Cabinet Leadership ===
- Prime Minister: Ali Sastroamidjojo (Indonesian National Party – PNI)
- First Deputy Prime Minister: Mohammed Roem (Masyumi Party)
- Second Deputy Prime Minister: Idham Chalid (Nahdlatul Ulama - NU)

== Cabinet Members ==
- Minister of Foreign Affairs: Ruslan Abdulgani (Indonesian National Party – PNI)
- Minister of Home Affairs: Soenarjo (Nahdlatul Ulama - NU)
- Minister of Defense ad interim: Ali Sastroamidjojo (Indonesian National Party – PNI)
- Minister of Justice: Muljatno (Masyumi)
- Minister of Information: Soedibjo (Indonesian Islamic Union Party - PSII)
- Minister of Finance: Jusuf Wibisono (Masyumi Party)
- Minister of Agriculture: Eny Karim (Indonesian National Party – PNI)
- Minister of Economic Affairs: Burhanuddin (Nahdlatul Ulama - NU)
- Minister of Transport: Suchjar Tedjasukmana (Masyumi Party)
- Minister of Public Works and Power: Pangeran Mohammad Noor (Masyumi Party)
- Minister of Labor: Sabilal Rasjad (Indonesian National Party – PNI)
- Minister of Social Affairs: Fatah Jasin (Nahdlatul Ulama - NU)
- Minister of Education & Culture: Sarino Mangunpranoto (Indonesian National Party – PNI)
- Minister of Religious Affairs: Moh. Iljas (Nahdlatul Ulama - NU)
- Minister of Health: Hadrianus Sinaga (Parkindo)
- Minister of Agrarian Affairs: A. A. Suhardi (PKRI)
- State Minister for Former Freedom Fighter Affairs: Dahlan Ibrahim (League of Supporters of Indonesian Independence - IPKI)
- State Minister for General Affairs: Rusli Abdul Wahid (Perti)
- State Minister for Planning Affairs: Djuanda Kartawidjaja
- Junior Minister for Agricultural Affairs: Sjech Marhaban (PSII)
- Junior Minister for Economic Affairs: F. F. Umbas (Parkindo)
- Junior Minister for Communications: A. B. de Rozari (PKRI)

== Changes ==
- The State Minister for Former Freedom Fighter Affairs became the State Minister for Veteran Affairs via Presidential Decision No. 111/1956 dated 30 April 1956. State Minister Dahlan Ibrahim resigned on 26 December 1956.
- On 9 January 1957 five ministers, Mohammed Roem, Jusuf Wibisono, Muljatno, Suchjar Tedjasukmana and Pangeran Mohammad Noor resigned. Djuanda became Finance Minister ad interim, Soenarjo Justice Minister ad interim and Suardi Public Works and Manpower Minister ad interim
- State Minister for General Affairs Rusli Abdul Wahid resigned on 15 January 1957.
- Minister of Foreign Affairs Ruslan Abdulgani was temporarily suspended from 28 January to 14 March 1957. Prime Minister Ali Sastroamidjojo acted as Foreign Minister for this period.
- Minister of Information Soedibjo and Junior Minister for Agricultural Affairs Sjech Marhaban were dismissed on 13 March and Second Deputy Prime Minister Idham Chalid was appointed ad interim Information Minister.
