= Rusiah Sardjono =

Indonesian politician

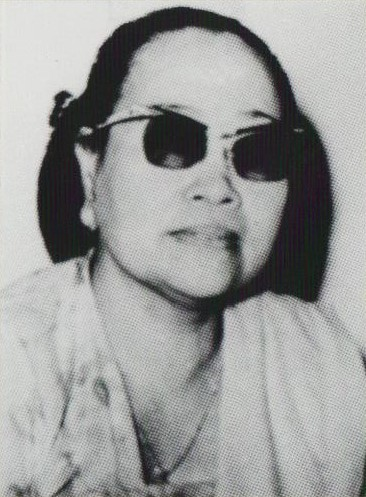

Minister of Social Affairs
- In office March 6, 1962 – March 27, 1966
- President: Sukarno
- Preceded by: Muljadi Djojomartono
- Succeeded by: Muljadi Djojomartono

Personal details
- Born: c. 22 June 1919
- Died: 13 November 1988 (aged 69)

Rusiah Sardjono (c. 22 June 1919 – 13 November 1988) was an Indonesian politician who served as minister of social affairs from 1962 to 1966. She was one of the country's first female government ministers.

== Biography ==
There are conflicting reports on Rusiah Sardjono's date of birth, with some sources indicating 1919 but others indicating 1921.

During the Japanese occupation of the Dutch East Indies, she was employed by a Japanese company before moving to the Indonesian Department of Justice, where she would work on and off for 20 years. She also worked for the High Court of Semarang during the height of the Indonesian National Revolution.

In 1949, she became the first woman to graduate in law from what would become Gadjah Mada University.

Sardjono was appointed minister of social affairs in 1962, in the later years of Sukarno's time in office as Indonesia's first president. While she was in office, Indonesian media commented on her then-unusual position as both a mother and a high-level politician. However, eventually several other women would later take on the social affairs ministry leadership post. Sardjono served as minister until 1966.

She later became a member of the Supreme Advisory Council, one of only two women on the 79-member council as of 1983. She also worked as a professor at the University of Indonesia's Faculty of Law until her death in 1988.

== See also ==
- List of female cabinet ministers of Indonesia
