= Idham Chalid =

Co-Founder of the United Development Party (c. 1921 – 2010

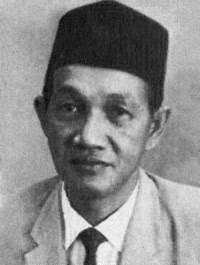
- Idham Chalid

7th Chairman of the Supreme Advisory Council
- In office 31 March 1978 – 19 March 1983
- President: Suharto
- Preceded by: Wilopo
- Succeeded by: Maraden Panggabean

3rd Speaker of the People's Consultative Assembly
- In office 28 October 1971 – 30 September 1977
- Preceded by: Abdul Haris Nasution
- Succeeded by: Adam Malik

6th Speaker of the House of Representatives
- In office 28 October 1971 – 30 September 1977
- Preceded by: Achmad Sjaichu
- Succeeded by: Adam Malik

Group represented in House of Representatives
- 1971–1973: Group of Nahdlatul Ulama
- 1973–1982: United Development Party

Ministerial roles
- 1956–1959: Deputy Prime Minister
- 1968–1971: Coordinating Minister of People's Welfare
- 1970–1971: Acting Minister of Social Affairs

Personal details
- Born: 27 August 1921 Satui, Dutch East Indies
- Died: 11 July 2010 (aged 88) Jakarta, Indonesia
- Resting place: Darul Qur'an Islamic School complex, Cisarua, Bogor
- Party: United Development Party (since 1971)
- Other political affiliations: Masyumi (until 1952); Nahdatul Ulama (1952–1971)
- Education: Al-Azhar University
- Occupation: Politician; ulama
- Known for: Co-founder of Kaaba Party

Idham Chalid (27 August 1921 – 11 July 2010) was an Indonesian politician and religious leader. He was one of the Founding Fathers of the United Development Party. He also served as chairman of the People's Consultative Assembly and chairman of the People's Representative Council from 1972 until 1977. A prominent leader of the Nahdlatul Ulama.

He was appointed a National Hero of Indonesia, along with 6 other figures, based on Presidential Decree No. 113/TK/Year 2011 dated 7 November 2011. On 19 December 2016, he was immortalized in the redesigned Rp. 5.000 rupiah banknote.

== Early life and education ==
=== Early life ===
Idham Chalid was born on August 27, 1921, in Satui, Tanah Bumbu regency, in the southeast portion of South Kalimantan. He is the eldest of five children. His father was Muhammad Chalid, a person from Amuntai, about 200 kilometers from Banjarmasin. When he was six years old, his family moved to Amuntai and lived in the Tangga Ulin area, his father's ancestral hometown.

=== Education ===
He was admitted to the second grade of Amuntai People's School (SR). After graduating from there, he continued his education to Madrasah Ar-Rasyidiyyah in 1922. Idham continued his education at the Gontor Islamic Boarding School located in Ponorogo, East Java. Becoming fluent in a number of languages, including Japanese. After graduating from Gontor, 1943, he continued his education in Jakarta. In the capital, his fluency resulted in him being employed as a translator between the Japanese and the Nahdlatul Ulama (NU).

Around this time, he graduated from an Islamic teaching college, and would go on to work as a teacher at Islamic institutes from 1943-1945.

== Political career ==
=== Early political career ===
Following the Proclamation of Independence, he joined the Indonesian People's Union, a local party, which then moved to the Indonesian Muslim Union. After working in local government, in 1950 he became a member of the People's Representative Council. After a short period as secretary general of the Nahdlatul Ulama, in 1956 he became chairman, a position he held until 1984. In March 1956, he was appointed second deputy prime minister in the Second Ali Sastroamidjojo Cabinet, and four years later became deputy chairman of the People's Consultative Assembly. In 1960, after Masyumi Party was banned by President Sukarno.

=== The New Order ===
Following the fall of President Sukarno, he served in the Ampera Cabinet and Revised Ampera Cabinet as minister of people's welfare from July 1966 until June 1968. He was reappointed to the First Development Cabinet as state minister for people's welfare. From 1972 to 1977, he was both speaker of the People's Representative Council and chairman of the People's Consultative Assembly.

== Death and Legacy ==
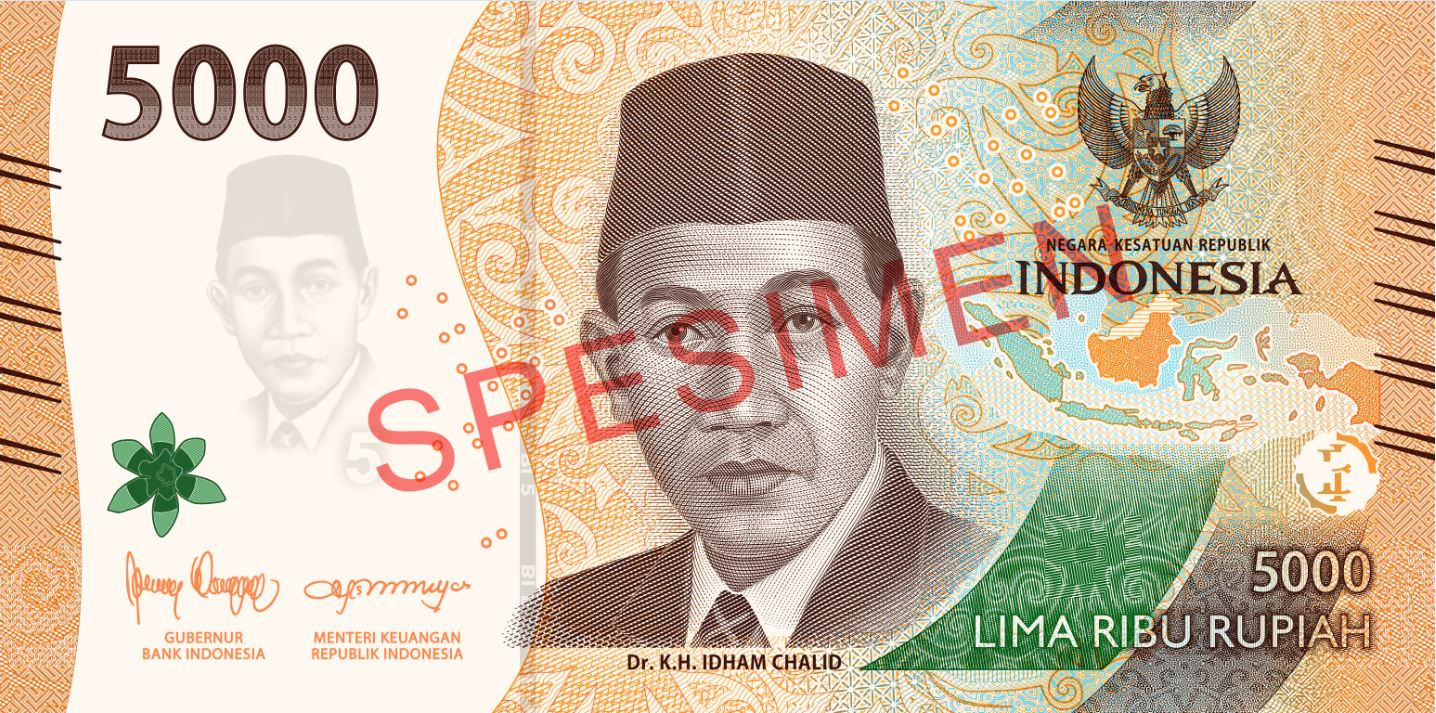
5,000 rupiah banknote featuring Idham Chalid, issued in 2022

Idham died in Cipete, South Jakarta on 11 July 2010 ten years after suffering a stroke. He was buried in the grounds of the Darul Qur`an Islamic Boarding School complex in Cisarua, Bogor. He was named a National Hero of Indonesia based on 113/TK/Tahun Presidential Decree No. 2011 dated 7 November 2011. He became the third Banjarese to receive the title.

Following the issuance of Presidential Decree No. 31 of 5 September 2016, Bank Indonesia introduced seven new banknote designs featuring national heroes. Idham Chalid's face is featured on the obverse of the Rp 5,000 banknote. Idham Chalid's face is also featured on the newer 2022 series.

Idham Chalid is now used as a name of hall in Amuntai, as well as at the South Kalimantan Government Complex in Banjarbaru, the current province's capital. His name is also named as hospital in Ciawi, Bogor.

== Notes ==
Political offices
Preceded by Abdul Haris Nasution	Speaker of the People's Consultative Assembly; 1971–1977	Succeeded by Adam Malik
Preceded by Achmad Sjaichu	Speaker of the House of Representatives; 1971–1977	Succeeded by Adam Malik
