= Muhadjir Effendy =

Indonesian politician and rector

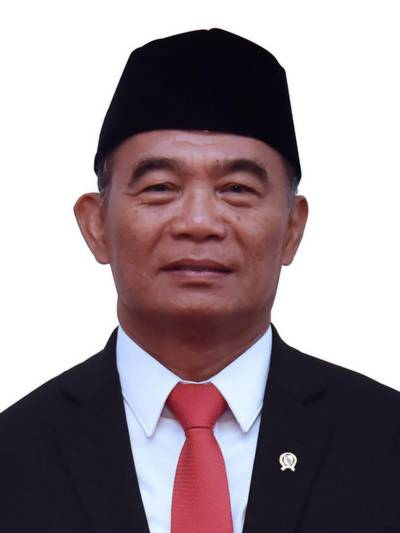
- Official portrait, 2019

18th Coordinating Minister for Human Development and Cultural Affairs
- In office 23 October 2019 – 20 October 2024
- President: Joko Widodo
- Preceded by: Darmin Nasution (acting); Puan Maharani
- Succeeded by: Pratikno

28th Minister of Education and Culture of Indonesia
- In office 27 July 2016 – 20 October 2019
- President: Joko Widodo
- Preceded by: Anies Baswedan
- Succeeded by: Nadiem Makarim

Personal details
- Born: 29 July 1956 (age 70) Madiun, East Java, Indonesia
- Party: Independent
- Spouse: Suryan Widati
- Children: Muktam Roya Azidan; Senoshaumi Hably; Harbantyo Ken Najjar
- Education: Muhammadiyah University of Malang; State University of Malang; Gadjah Mada University; Airlangga University

Muhadjir Effendy (born 29 July 1956) is an Indonesian politician and rector. He was the minister of education and culture of the Republic of Indonesia in the Working Cabinet. He was appointed by President Joko Widodo on 27 July 2016 replacing Anies Baswedan. Effendy was also the Rector of Muhammadiyah University of Malang in Indonesia from 2000 to 2016. In addition Muhadjir is chairman of Muhammadiyah Central Board of Education and Culture.

== Personal life and career ==
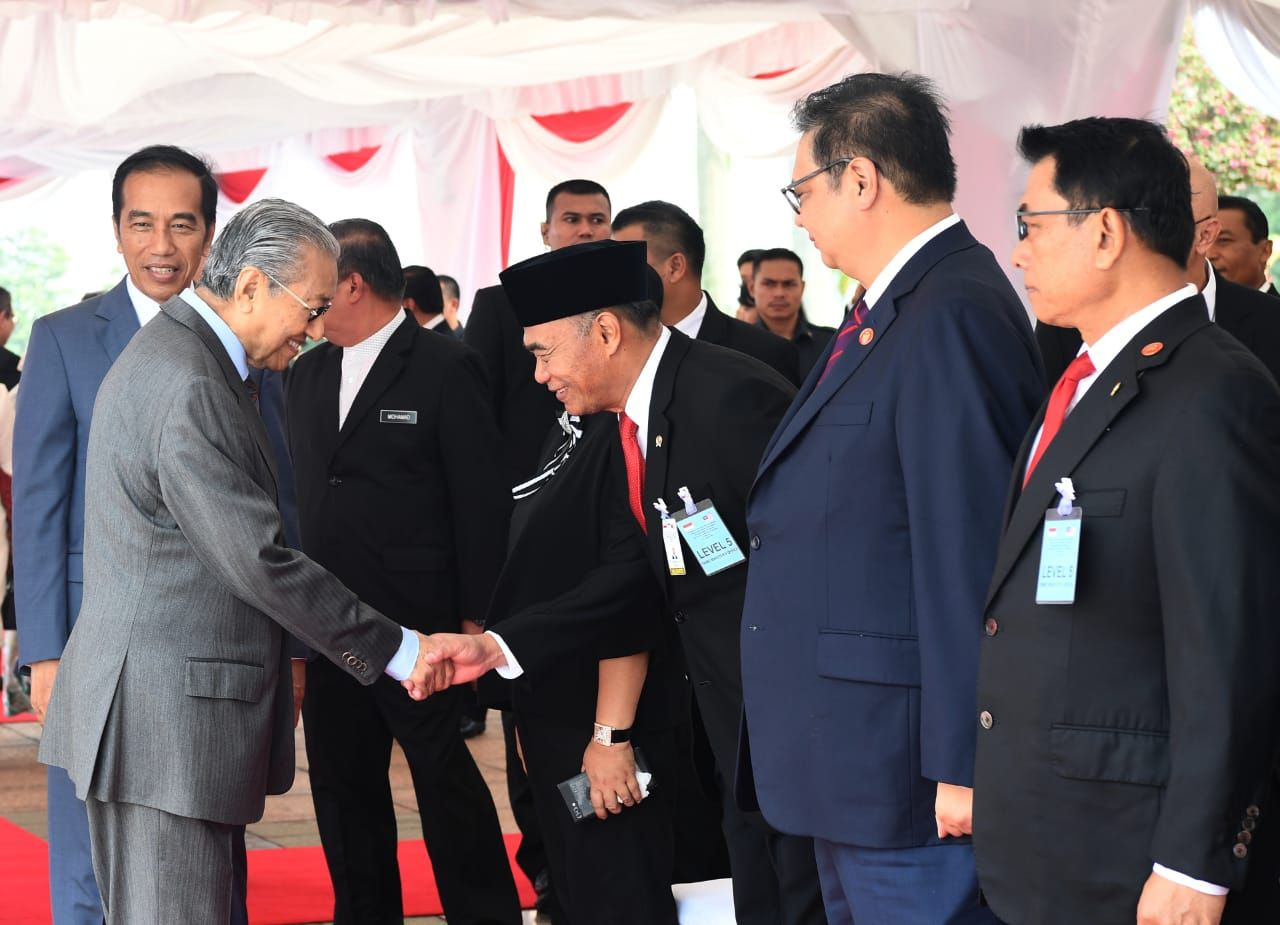
In 2019, Muhadjir Effendy accompanied President Joko Widodo on a visit to Malaysia and shook hands with Malaysian Prime Minister Mahathir Mohamad.

Muhadjir wrote his baccalaureate at IAIN Malang. He earned a degree at Malang Teachers' Training College (now State University of Malang). In 1996, he obtained a master's degree in Public administration from the Gadjah Mada University. In 2008, Effendy successfully completed his Doctoral program in military sociology from the Airlangga University. Muhadjir is currently listed as professor of Sociology Department in the State University of Malang. Since 2015 he was appointed Chairman of Central Board of Muhammadiyah and is expected to serve till 2020.

In addition, Muhadjir has also published several books such as "Bala Dewa", "As Witnessed Dahlan Young", "Masyarakat equilibrium: meniti perubahan dalam bingkai keseimbangan", "Pedagogi kemanusiaan: sebuah refleksi multidimensional" as well as "Muhammadiyah and Education in Indonesia".

== Controversy ==
=== Statement on marriage ===
Muhadjir becomes centre of controversy when he made a statement of a webinar that "the rich should marry the poor" and urged the Minister of Religious Affairs to declare a fatwa about it. His proposal later caused backlash among internet users and accused him of hurting the feelings of the poor citizens. He later clarify his statement and call it just an "intermezzo".
