= Third Working Cabinet =

Indonesian cabinet in Sukarno era

Third Working Cabinet Kabinet Kerja III
- 21st Cabinet of Indonesia
- 1962–1963
- Date formed: 8 March 1962
- Date dissolved: 13 November 1963

People and organisations
- Head of state: Sukarno
- Head of government: Sukarno
- No. of ministers: 56 ministers

History
- Predecessor: Working II Cabinet
- Successor: Working IV Cabinet

The Third Working Cabinet (Indonesian: Kabinet Kerja III) was an Indonesian cabinet that resulted from a 6 March 1962 reshuffle of the previous cabinet by President Sukarno. It consisted of a first minister, two deputy first ministers, eight coordinating ministers, 36 ministers, as well as 13 members who headed various government bodies. It was dissolved on 13 November 1963.

== Composition ==
=== Cabinet Leadership ===
- Prime Minister: Sukarno
- First Minister: Djuanda Kartawidjaja
- First Deputy First Minister: Johannes Leimena
- Second Deputy First Minister: Subandrio

=== Foreign Affairs/Overseas Economic Relations ===
- Deputy Prime Minister/Coordinating Minister: Subandrio

=== Home Affairs ===
- Deputy Prime Minister/Coordinating Minister: Sahardjo
- Minister of General Government and Regional Autonomy: Ipik Gandamana
- Minister of Justice: Sahardjo
- Minister/Chairman of the Supreme Court: Wirjono Prodjodikoro

=== Defense and Security ===
- Deputy Prime Minister/Coordinating Minister of Defense and concurrent Minister/Chief-of-Staff of the Army: Gen. Abdul Haris Nasution
- Minister/Chief-of-Staff of the Navy: Commodore R. E. Martadinata
- Minister/Chief-of-Staff of the Air Force: Air Marshal Omar Dani
- Minister/Chief of the National Police: Insp. Gen. Soekarno Djojonegoro
- Minister/Attorney General: Kadarusman
- Minister of Veteran Affairs: Brig. Gen. Sambas Atmadinata
- Minister assigned to the Deputy Prime Minister of Defense and Security: Lt. Gen. Hidajat

=== Production ===
- Deputy Prime Minister/Coordinating Minister: Maj. Gen. Suprajogi
- Minister of Agriculture/Agrarian Affairs: Sadjarwo Djarwonagoro
- Minister of Labor: Ahem Erningpradja
- Minister of Public Works and Power: Maj. Gen. Suprajogi
- Minister of Basic Industries and Mining: Chairul Saleh
- Minister of People's Industry: Maj. Gen. Azis Saleh
- Minister of National Research: Sudjono Djuned Pusponegoro

=== Distribution ===
- Deputy Prime Minister/Coordinating Minister: Johannes Leimena
- Minister of Trade: Soeharto Sastrosoeyoso
- Minister of Land Transportation and Post, Telecommunications and Tourism: Lt. Gen. Djatikoesoemo
- Minister of Maritime Transportation: Abdul Mutalib Danuningrat
- Minister of Air Transportation: Col. R. Iskandar
- Minister of Cooperatives: Achmadi

=== Finance ===
- Deputy Prime Minister/Coordinating Minister: Notohamiprodjo
- Minister of Income, Payment and Oversight: Notohamiprodjo
- Minister of State Budget Affairs: Arifin Harahap
- Minister of Central Bank Affairs: Sumarno

=== Welfare ===
- Deputy Prime Minister/Coordinating Minister: Muljadi Djojomartono
- Minister of Religious Affairs: Sjaifuddin Zuchri
- Minister of Social Affairs: Rusiah Sardjono
- Minister of Health: Maj. Gen. Dr. Satrio
- Minister of Basic Education & Culture: Prijono
- Minister of College & Knowledge: Thojib Hadiwidjaja
- Minister of Sport: Maladi

=== Special Affairs ===
- Deputy Prime Minister/Coordinating Minister: Muhammad Yamin
- Minister of Information: Muhammad Yamin
- Minister of Relations with the People's Representative Council/People's Consultative Assembly/Supreme Advisory Council/National Planning Agency: W. J. Rumambi
- Minister of Relations with Religious Scholars: Fatah Jasin
- Minister/Secretary General of the National Front: Sudibjo

=== Leaders of State Bodies/Deputy First Ministers ===
- Chairman of the Provisional People's Consultative Assembly: Chairul Saleh
- Speaker of the Mutual Assistance People's Representative Council: Zainul Arifin
- Deputy Chairman of the Supreme Advisory Council: Sartono
- Deputy Chairman of the National Planning Agency: Muhammad Yamin

=== Leaders of State Bodies/Ministers ===
- Vice Chairman of the Provisional People's Consultative Assembly: Ali Sastroamidjojo
- Deputy Chairman of the Provisional People's Consultative Assembly: Idham Chalid
- Deputy Chairman of the Provisional People's Consultative Assembly: Dipa Nusantara Aidit
- Deputy Chairman of the Provisional People's Consultative Assembly: Brig. Gen. Wilujo Puspojudo
- Deputy Speaker of the Mutual Assistance People's Representative Council: Arudji Kartawinata
- Deputy Speaker of the Mutual Assistance People's Representative Council: I Gusti Gde Subamia
- Deputy Speaker of the Mutual Assistance People's Representative Council: M. H. Lukman
- Deputy Speaker of the Mutual Assistance People's Representative Council: Mursalin Daeng Mamangung

=== Minister assigned to the President ===
- State Minister: Iwa Kusumasumantri

=== Official with ministerial rank ===
- Chairman of the State Apparatus Oversight Board: Sultan Hamengkubuwono IX

== Changes ==
- On 12 April 1962, the State Apparatus Oversight Board was abolished by presidential degree and Sultan Hamengkubuwono IX left the cabinet.
- On 4 May 1962, Johannes Leimena and Subandrio were appointed First and Second Deputy Prime minister respectively, with effect from 6 March.
- On 21 June 1962, Ahmad Yani replaced Nasution as Army Chief of Staff. Nasution was appointed Deputy First Minister/Chief of Staff of the Indonesian National Armed Forces.
- On 23 August 1962, Mohammad Ichsan and Abdul Wahab Surjoadiningrat were both appointed Minister/State Secretary
- Following the death of Muhammad Yamin, Ruslan Abdulgani was appointed Deputy Prime Minister/Coordinating Minister/Minister of Information on 24 October 1962.
- From 30 January 1963, chiefs-of-staff were retitled commanders of the respective armed forces* branches.
- Following the death of Mutual Assistance People's Representative Council Chairman Zainal Arifin, he was replaced by Deputy Chairman Arudji Kartawinata on 4 March 1963, who in turn was replaced by Achmad Sjaichu on 3 September.
- On 11 April 1963, Minister Hidajat was appointed Minister of Land Transportation and Post, Telecommunications and Tourism, replacing Lt. Gen. Djatikusumo, who was appointed extraordinary ambassador for the Malaya land dispute.
- Prime Minister Djuanda died on 7 November 1963. He was not replaced.
