= Fourth Working Cabinet =

Fourth Working Cabinet Kabinet Kerja IV
- 22nd Cabinet of Indonesia
- 1963–1964
- Date formed: 23 November 1963
- Date dissolved: 27 August 1964

People and organisations
- Head of state: Sukarno
- Head of government: Sukarno
- No. of ministers: 61 ministers

History
- Predecessor: Working III Cabinet
- Successor: Dwikora I Cabinet

The Fourth Working Cabinet (Indonesian: Kabinet Kerja IV) was an Indonesian cabinet that resulted from regrouping of the previous cabinet by President Sukarno. It consisted of three deputy prime ministers, eight coordinating ministers, 33 ministers, six ministers of state, as well as 11 cabinet members who headed various government bodies. It was dissolved on 27 August 1964.

== Composition ==
=== Cabinet Leadership ===
- Prime Minister: Sukarno

=== Presidium ===
- First Deputy Prime Minister: Subandrio
- Second Deputy Prime Minister: Johannes Leimena
- Third Deputy Prime Minister: Chairul Saleh

=== Foreign and Foreign Economic Relations Section ===
- Coordinating Minister for the Foreign and Foreign Economic Relations Section ad interim: Subandrio
- Minister of Foreign Affairs and Foreign Economic Relations: Subandrio

=== Justice and Home Affairs Section ===
- Coordinating Minister for the Justice and Home Affairs Section ad interim: Wirjono Prodjodikoro
- Minister of Home Affairs: Ipik Gandamana
- Minister of Justice ad interim: Wirjono Prodjodikoro
- Minister/Chief Justice of the Supreme Court: Wirjono Prodjodikoro
- Minister/Attorney General: Kadarusman

=== Defense and Security Section ===
- Coordinating Minister for the Defense and Security Section ad interim: Abdul Haris Nasution
- Minister/Commander of the Army: Maj. Gen. Ahmad Yani
- Minister/Commander of the Navy: Commodore R. E. Martadinata
- Minister/Commander of the Air Force: Air Marshal Omar Dani
- Minister/Chief of the National Police: Insp. Gen. Soekarno Djojonegoro

=== Finance Section ===
- Coordinating Minister for the Finance Section: Sumarno
- Minister of Supplies, costs and Oversight: Sumarno
- Minister of State Budget Affairs: Arifin Harahap
- Minister of Central Bank Affairs: Jusuf Muda Dalam
- Minister of Control of Banks and Private Capital: Soeharto Sastrosoeyoso

=== Development Section ===
- Coordinating Minister for the Development Section: Chairul Saleh
- Minister of Basic Industries and Mining: Chairul Saleh
- Minister of People's Industry: Maj. Gen. Azis Saleh
- Minister of Public Works and Power: Maj. Gen. Suprajogi
- Minister of Agriculture: Sadjarwo Djarwonagoro
- Minister of National Research: Soedjono Djuned Pusponegoro
- Minister of Labor: Ahem Erningpradja
- Minister of National development Planning: Soeharto Sastrosoeyoso
- Minister of Veterans' Affairs and Demobilization: Brig. Gen. Sambas Atmadinata

=== Distribution Section ===
- Coordinating Minister for the Distribution Section: Johannes Leimena
- Minister of Trade: Adam Malik
- Minister of Transmigration, Cooperatives and the Development of Villagers: Achmadi
- Minister of Land Transportation and Post, Telecommunications and Tourism: Lt. Gen. Hidajat
- Minister of Maritime Transportation: Brig. Gen. (MC) Ali Sadikin
- Minister of Air Transportation: Col. (AF) R. Iskandar

=== Welfare Section ===
- Coordinating Minister for the Public Welfare Section: Muljadi Djojomartono
- Minister of Religious Affairs: Sjaifuddin Zuchri
- Minister of Social Affairs: Rusiah Sardjono
- Minister of Health: Maj. Gen. Dr. Satrio
- Minister of Basic Education & Culture: Prijono
- Minister of Science and Higher and University Education: Thojib Hadiwidjaja
- Minister of Sport: Maladi
- Minister of Relations with Religious Scholars: Fatah Jasin

=== Relations with the People Section ===
- Coordinating Minister for the Relations with the People Section: Ruslan Abdulgani
- Minister of Information: Ruslan Abdulgani
- Minister of Relations with the People's Representative Council/People's Consultative Assembly/Supreme Advisory Council/National Planning Agency: W. J. Rumambi
- Minister/Secretary General of the National Front: Sudibjo

=== Presidential Advisory Ministers ===
- Presidential/Prime Ministerial Advisory Minister of funds and forces: Notohamiiprodjo
- State Minister Assigned to the President: Iwa Kusumasumantri
- Minister and Military Adviser to the Indonesian President: ACM S. Surjadarma

=== Leaders of State Bodies Ministers with Ministerial Status ===
- Chairman of the Provisional People's Consultative Assembly: Chairul Saleh
- Speaker of the Mutual Assistance People's Representative Council: Arudji Kartawinata
- Deputy Chairman of the Supreme Advisory Council: Sartono
- Deputy Chairman of the Provisional People's Consultative Assembly: Ali Sastroamidjojo
- Deputy Chairman of the Provisional People's Consultative Assembly: Idham Chalid
- Deputy Chairman of the Provisional People's Consultative Assembly: Dipa Nusantara Aidit
- Deputy Chairman of the Provisional People's Consultative Assembly: Brig. Gen. Wilujo Puspojudo
- Deputy Speaker of the Mutual Assistance People's Representative Council:I Gusti Gde Subamia
- Deputy Speaker of the Mutual Assistance People's Representative Council: M. H. Lukman
- Deputy Speaker of the Mutual Assistance People's Representative Council: Mursalin Daeng Mamangung
- Deputy Speaker of the Mutual Assistance People's Representative Council: Achmad Sjaichu
