= Second Working Cabinet (Sukarno) =

Second Working Cabinet Kabinet Kerja II
- 20th Cabinet of Indonesia
- 1960–1962
- Date formed: 18 February 1960
- Date dissolved: 6 March 1962

People and organisations
- Head of state: Sukarno
- Head of government: Sukarno
- No. of ministers: 39 ministers

History
- Predecessor: Working I Cabinet
- Successor: Working III Cabinet

The Second Working Cabinet (Indonesian: Kabinet Kerja II) was an Indonesian cabinet that served from 18 February 1960 until 6 March 1962, when President Sukarno reshuffled it.

== Composition ==
=== Cabinet Leadership ===
- Prime Minister: Sukarno
- First Minister: Djuanda Kartawidjaja
- Deputy Prime Minister: Johannes Leimena

=== Core Cabinet Ministers ===
- Minister of National Defense: Lt. Gen. Abdul Haris Nasution
- Minister of Foreign Affairs: Subandrio
- Minister of Home Affairs and Autonomy: Ipik Gandamana
- Minister of Justice: Sahardjo
- Minister of Finance I: Djuanda
- Minister of Finance II: Notohamiprodjo
- Minister of Production: Col. Suprajogi
- Minister of Distribution: Johannes Leimena
- Minister of Development: Chairul Saleh
- Minister of Public Prosperity: Muljadi Djojomartono
- Minister of Health: Col. Dr. Satrio
- Minister of Education & Culture: Prijono
- Minister of Religious Affairs: Wahib Wahab
- Minister/Deputy Chairman of the People's Representative Council: Roeslan Abdulgani
- Minister/Chairman of the National Planning Agency Muhammad Yamin
- Minister of Relations with the Legislature: W. J. Rumambi
- Minister/Presidential Legal Adviser: Wirjono Prodjodikoro

=== Non-Core Cabinet Ministers ===
==== First Ministerial Section ====
- Minister of Information: Maladi
- Minister of Relations with Religious Scholars: Fatah Jasin
- Minister of Manpower Mobilization: Sudibjo
- Minister of Manpower Mobilization: Soedjono

==== National Security Ministry Section ====
- Minister/Deputy Minister for National Defense: Maj. Gen. Hidajat
- Minister/Chief-of-Staff of the Army: Gen. A. H. Nasution
- Minister/Chief-of-Staff of the Navy: Com. R.E. Martadinata
- Minister/Chief-of-Staff of the Air Force: Air Chief Marshal S. Surjadarma
- Minister/Chief of the National Police: Insp. Gen. Soekarno Djojonegoro
- Deputy Minister of State for Veterans' Affairs: Col. Sambas Atmadinata
- Minister/Attorney General: Gunawan

==== Production Ministry Section ====
- Minister of Agriculture: Brig. Gen. Azis Saleh
- Minister of Public Works and Power: Sardjono Dipokusumo
- Minister of Labor: Ahem Erningpradja

==== Distribution Ministry Section ====
- Minister of Land Transportation and Post, Telecommunications and Tourism: Maj. Gen. Djatikoesoemo
- Junior Minister of Maritime Transportation: Abdul Mutalib Danuningrat
- Junior Minister of Air Transportation: Colonel R. Iskandar
- Junior Minister of Trade: Arifin Harahap

==== Development Ministry Section ====
- Minister of Basic Industries and Mining: Chairul Saleh
- Minister of People's Industry: R. Suharto
- Minister of Agrarian Affairs: Sadjarwo Djarwonagoro
- Minister of Transmigration, Cooperatives & Development of Village Communities: Achmadi

=== Ministry Level Officials ===
- Chairman of the State Apparatus Oversight Agency: Sultan Hamengkubuwana IX

== Changes ==
- From 1 July 1960, Djuanda was no longer Finance Minister.
- On 20 December 1960, Subandrio was appointed Secondy Deputy First Minister. He retained his position as Foreign Minister.
- On 3 March 1962, the position of Minister of Education & Culture was renamed Minister of Education, Knowledge & Culture. A new section, Education, Knowledge & Culture, was formed comprising the Ministry of Basic Education and Culture, led by Minister Prijono and the Ministry of Higher Education and Knowledge, led by Iwa Kusumasumantri.
- On 19 January 1962, Minister/Air Force Chief of Staff Air Chief Marshal S. Surjadarma was replaced by Air Marshal Omar Dani.
- On 28 February 1962, Minister of Religious Affairs Wahib Wahab was replaced by Sjaifuddin Zuchris
