= List of ministers of home affairs (Indonesia) =

Minister of Home Affairs
- Menteri Dalam Negeri
- Seal of the Ministry of Home Affairs

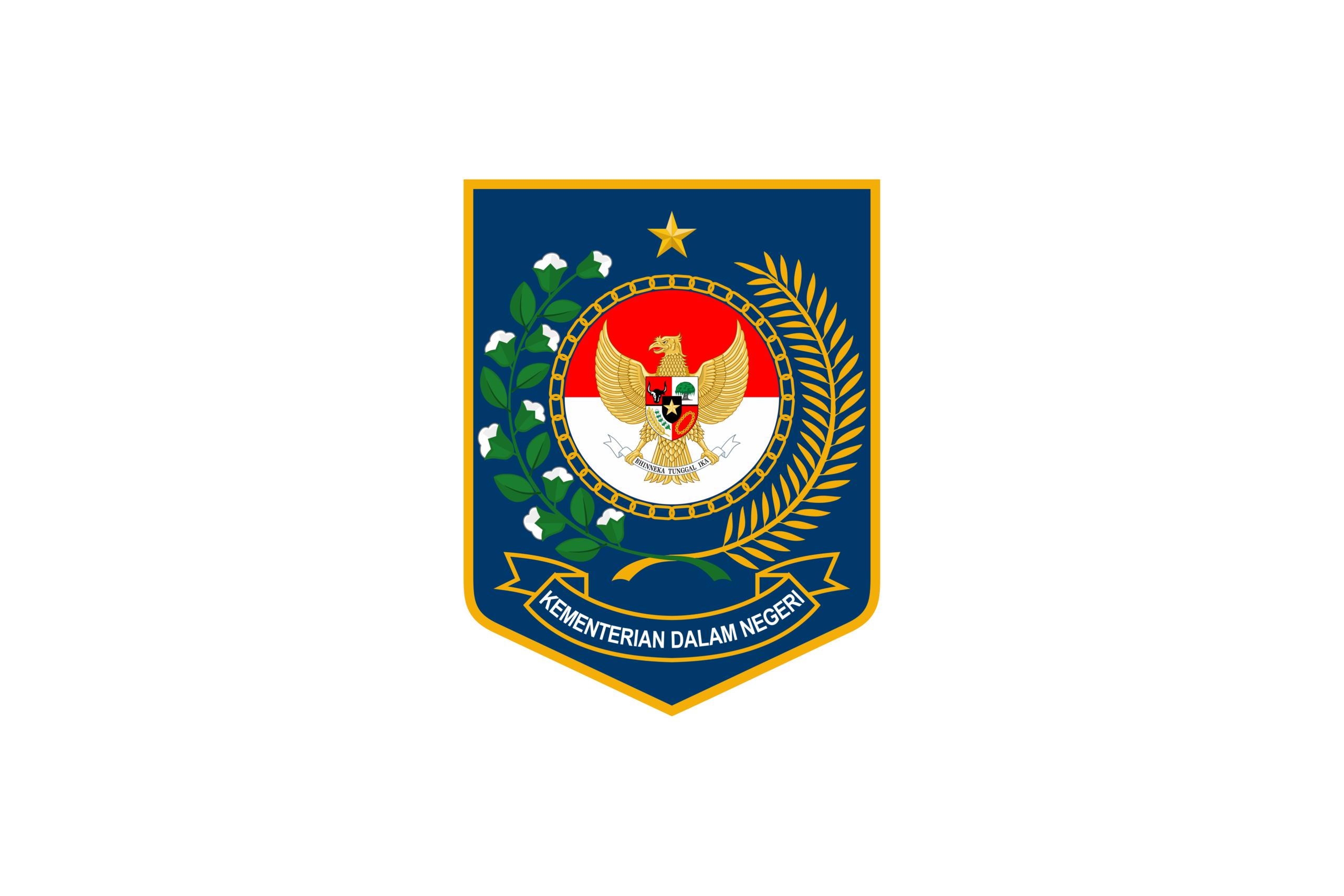
- Flag of the Ministry of Home Affairs

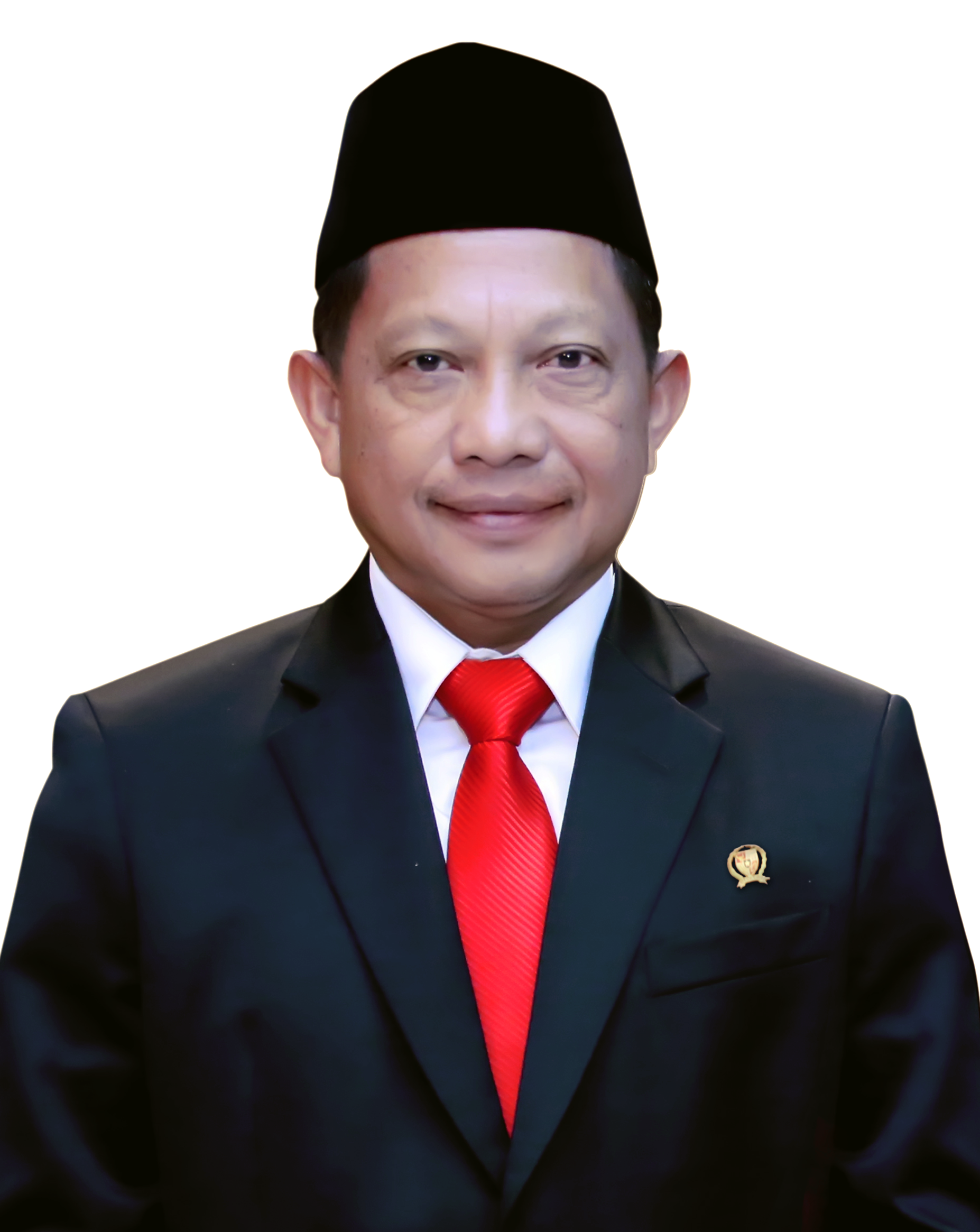
- Incumbent; Tito Karnavian since 23 October 2019
- Ministry of Home Affairs
- Abbreviation: Mendagri
- Member of: Cabinet
- Seat: Jl. Medan Merdeka Utara No. 7 Jakarta 10110
- Appointer: President of Indonesia
- Inaugural holder: Wiranatakusumah V
- Formation: 19 August 1945; 81 years ago
- Website: www.kemendagri.go.id

This article lists persons and politicians who have been appointed as the minister of home affairs in Indonesia.

Non-partisan (9) PSI (2) Masyumi (2) PSII (1); Parindra (2) PNI (3) NU (1) ABRI/TNI (3) Golkar (8) PDI-P (1)
No.	Portrait	Name	Cabinet	Took office	Left office	Notes	R
1		Wiranatakusumah V	Presidential	19 August 1945	14 November 1945		
2		Sutan Sjahrir	Sjahrir I	14 November 1945	12 March 1946	Also serving as Prime Minister and Minister of Foreign Affairs.	
3		Sudarsono	Sjahrir II	12 March 1946	2 October 1946		
4		Mohammad Roem	Sjahrir III	2 October 1946	26 June 1947		
5		Wondoamiseno	Amir Sjarifuddin I	3 July 1947	11 November 1947		
(4)		Mohammad Roem	Amir Sjarifuddin II	11 November 1947	23 January 1948		
6		Soekiman Wirjosandjojo	Hatta I	29 January 1948	4 August 1948		
—		Teuku Muhammad Hasan	Emergency	19 December 1948	31 March 1949	Serving as the ad-interim Minister of Home Affairs prior to Soekiman's arrival in Bukittingi, the center of the Emergency cabinet.	
—		Soekiman Wirjosandjojo	Emergency	31 March 1949	13 July 1949	Also serving as Minister of Health.	
7		Wongsonegoro	Hatta II	4 August 1949	20 December 1949		
—		Ida Anak Agung Gde Agung	RUSI	20 December 1949	6 September 1950		
8		Susanto Tirtoprodjo	Susanto	20 December 1949	21 January 1950	Also served as the acting Prime Minister.	
8		Susanto Tirtoprodjo	Halim	21 January 1950	6 September 1950		
9		Assaat	Natsir	6 September 1950	3 April 1951		
10		Iskaq Tjokroadisurjo	Sukiman	27 April 1951	3 April 1952		
(4)		Mohammad Roem	Wilopo	3 April 1952	30 July 1953		
11		Hazairin	Ali Sastroamidjojo I	30 July 1953	12 August 1955		
—		Zainul Arifin (ad-interim)	Ali Sastroamidjojo I	23 October 1954	19 November 1954	Also serve as Deputy Prime Minister and Minister for State Welfare	
12		R. Sunaryo	Ali Sastroamidjojo I	19 November 1954	24 Juli 1955		
12		R. Sunaryo	Burhanuddin Harahap	12 August 1955	19 January 1956		
—		Soeroso (ad-interim)	Burhanuddin Harahap	19 January 1956	24 March 1956		
(12)		R. Sunaryo	Ali Sastroamidjojo II	24 March 1956	14 March 1957		
13		Sanusi Hardjadinata	Djuanda	9 April 1957	10 July 1959		
14		Ipik Gandamana	Working I	10 July 1959	18 February 1960	Position renamed to Minister of Internal Affairs and Regional Autonomy	
14		Ipik Gandamana	Working II	18 February 1960	6 March 1962		
14		Ipik Gandamana	Working III	6 March 1962	13 November 1963	Position renamed to Minister of General Government and Regional Autonomy	
14		Ipik Gandamana	Working IV	13 November 1963	27 August 1964	Position renamed to Minister of Home Affairs	
15		Soemarno Sosroatmodjo	Dwikora I	27 August 1964	22 February 1966	Also serving as the Governor of Jakarta.	
15		Soemarno Sosroatmodjo	Dwikora II	22 February 1966	18 March 1966	Also serving as the Governor of Jakarta.	
16		Basuki Rahmat	Dwikora II	18 March 1966	28 March 1966		
16		Basuki Rahmat	Dwikora III	28 March 1966	25 July 1966		
16		Basuki Rahmat	Ampera I	28 July 1966	14 October 1967		
16		Basuki Rahmat	Ampera II	14 October 1967	10 June 1968		
16		Basuki Rahmat	Development I	10 June 1968	8 January 1969		
17		Amir Machmud	Development I	28 January 1969	28 March 1973		
17		Amir Machmud	Development II	28 March 1973	29 March 1978		
17		Amir Machmud	Development III	29 March 1978	1 October 1982	Since 1 October 1982 was appointed as the Speaker of the People's Representative Council	
—		Sudharmono	Development III	1 October 1982	19 March 1983	Also serving as the State Minister of State Secretary	
18		Soepardjo Rustam	Development IV	19 March 1983	21 March 1988		
19		Rudini	Development V	21 March 1988	17 March 1993		
20		Yogie Suardi Memet	Development VI	17 March 1993	14 March 1998		
21		Hartono	Development VII	14 March 1998	21 May 1998		
22		Syarwan Hamid	Development Reform	23 May 1998	1 October 1999	Since 1 October 1999 was appointed as the member of the People's Representative Council.	
—		Feisal Tanjung (ad-interim)	Development Reform	1 October 1999	20 October 1999	Also serving as the Coordinating Minister for Political and Security Affairs.	
23		Soerjadi Soedirdja	National Unity	26 October 1999	23 July 2001		
24		Hari Sabarno	Mutual Assistance	10 August 2001	20 October 2004		
25		Mohammad Ma'ruf	United Indonesia I	21 October 2004	2 March 2007		
—		Widodo Adi Sutjipto (ad-interim)	United Indonesia I	2 March 2007	29 August 2007		
26		Mardiyanto	United Indonesia I	29 August 2007	20 October 2009		
27		Gamawan Fauzi	United Indonesia II	22 October 2009	20 October 2014		
28		Tjahjo Kumolo	Working	27 October 2014	20 October 2019		
29		Tito Karnavian	Onward	23 October 2019	Incumbent		

== See also ==
- Cabinet of Indonesia
- Ministry of Home Affairs (Indonesia)

== Bibliography ==
- Department of Internal Affairs (1996), Departemen Dalam Negeri dari Masa ke Masa: tentang Biografi Menteri-Menteri 1945-1995 (in Indonesian), Jakarta
