= Working Cabinet =

Working Cabinet may refer to a number of presidential cabinets of Indonesia:

- Djuanda Cabinet ('Working Cabinet'), 1957–1959
- First Working Cabinet, 1959–1960
- Second Working Cabinet (Sukarno), 1960–1962
- Third Working Cabinet, 1962–1963
- Fourth Working Cabinet, 1963–1964
- Working Cabinet (2014–2019)
- Onward Indonesia Cabinet, from 2019
