= First Working Cabinet =

First Working Cabinet Kabinet Kerja I
- 19th Cabinet of Indonesia
- 1959–1960
- Date formed: 10 July 1959
- Date dissolved: 18 February 1960

People and organisations
- Head of state: Sukarno
- Head of government: Sukarno
- No. of ministers: 32 ministers

History
- Predecessor: Djuanda Cabinet
- Successor: Working II Cabinet

The First Working Cabinet (Indonesian: Kabinet Kerja I) was an Indonesian cabinet that served from 10 July 1959 until 18 February 1960, when President Sukarno reshuffled it.

== Composition ==
=== Cabinet Leadership ===
- Prime Minister: Sukarno
- Deputy Prime Minister: Djuanda Kartawidjaja

=== Cabinet Members ===
- Minister of Defense and Security : Lt. Gen. Abdul Haris Nasution
- Minister of Foreign Affairs: Subandrio
- Minister of Finance: Djuanda
- Minister of Production: Col. Suprajogi
- Minister of Distribution: Johannes Leimena
- Minister of Public Prosperity: Muljadi Djojomartono
- Minister of Home Affairs and Autonomy: Ipik Gandamana
- Minister of Social and Cultural Affairs: Muhammad Yamin

=== Ex Officio Ministers of State ===
- Minister/Army Chief of Staff: Lt. Gen. A. H. Nasution
- Minister/Air Force Chief of Staff: Air Marshal S. Surjadarma
- Minister/Navy Chief of Staff: Captain R. E. Martadinata
- Minister/National Police Chief of Staff: Chief Commissioner Said Sukanto Tjokroatmodjo
- Attorney General ad-interim: Gatot Taroenamihardja
- Minister/Vice Chairman of the Supreme Advisory Council: Ruslan Abdulgani
- Minister/Chairman of the National Planning Council: Muhammad Yamin

== Junior Ministers ==
=== First Ministerial Section ===
- Junior Minister of Information: Maladi
- Junior Minister of People's Mobilization: Soedjono and Sudjono (joint ministers)
- Junior Minister of Relations with the Legislature: W. J. Rumambi
- Junior Minister of Relations with Religious Scholars: Fatah Jasin
- Junior Minister of Defense: Maj. Gen. Hidajat
- Junior Minister of Justice: Sahardjo
- Junior Minister of Police: Chief Commissioner Said Sukanto Tjokroatmodjo
- Junior Minister of Veteran Affairs: Col. Sambas Atmadinata

=== Financial Section ===
- Junior Minister of Finance: Notohamiprodjo

=== Production Affairs ===
- Junior Minister of Agriculture: Col. Azis Saleh
- Junior Minister of Public Works and Power: Sardjono Dipokusumo
- Junior Minister of Labor: Ahem Erningpradja

=== Distribution Section ===
- Junior Minister of Maritime Transportation: Abdul Mutalib Danuningrat
- Junior Minister of Land Transportation and Post, Telegraph and Telephones: Maj. Gen. Djatikoesoemo
- Junior Minister of Air Transportation: Colonel R. Iskandar
- Junior Minister of Trade: Arifin Harahap

=== Development Section ===
- Junior Minister of People's Industry: Soeharto Sastrosoeyoso
- Junior Minister of Basic Industries and Mining: Chairul Saleh
- Junior Minister of Agrarian Affairs: Sadjarwo Djarwonagoro
- Junior Minister of Transmigration, Cooperatives & Development of Village Communities: Achmadi

=== Public Welfare Section ===
- Junior Minister of Welfare: Colonel Satrio
- Junior Minister of Religion: Wahib Wahab
- Junior Minister of Social Affairs: Muljadi Djojomartono

=== Social & Cultural Section ===
- Junior Minister of Education & Culture: Prijono

== Changes ==
- Johannes Leimena was appointed Deputy First Minister on 27 July 1959. He retained his job as Distribution Minister
- On 30 July 1959, the Social-Cultural Section was abolished. The Junior Minister of Education & Culture was moved to the First Ministerial Section. Muhammad Yamin was appointed Chairman of the National Planning Agency and became an ex officio minister.
- on 15 August, Sultan Hamengkubuwana IX was appointed Minister/Chairman of the State Apparatus Oversight Agency and Roeslan Abdulgani became acting Chairman of the Supreme Advisory council and ex officio minister.
- On 22 September 1956, Attorney General ad-interim Gatot Tarunamihardja was replaced by Zainal Abidin.
- On 15 December 1959, Junior Minister of Police Said Sukanto Tjokroatmodjo was replaced by Chief Commissioner Soekarno Djojonegoro.
