= Working Cabinet (Sukarno) =

Sukarno's Working Cabinet may refer to:

- First Working Cabinet (Sukarno)
- Second Working Cabinet (Sukarno)
- Third Working Cabinet
- Fourth Working Cabinet
