= Dadang Suprayogi =

Indonesian military officer and politician

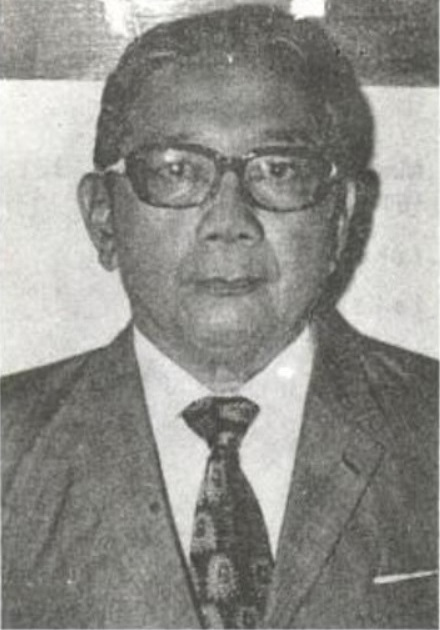
- Suprayogi, c. 1970

Chairman of the Audit Board of Indonesia
- In office 1966–1973
- Preceded by: Hamengkubuwono IX
- Succeeded by: Umar Wirahadikusumah

Minister of Production
- In office 25 June 1958 (Note: As State Minister for Economic Stabilization between 25 June 1958 and 9 July 1959, and as Coordinating Minister between 6 March 1962 to 13 November 1963.) – 13 November 1963
- Preceded by: position created
- Succeeded by: Chaerul Saleh; Sadjarwo Djarwonagoro (Note: There were no Ministers of Production in the Fourth Working Cabinet. Ministries previously under the Coordinating Ministry of Production were split into the Coordinating Ministry for Development and Coordinating Ministry of Agriculture.)

Minister of Public Works and Power
- In office 6 March 1962 – 22 February 1966
- Preceded by: Sardjono Dipokusumo
- Succeeded by: Sutami

Personal details
- Born: 12 April 1914 Bandung, Dutch East Indies
- Died: 13 September 1998 (aged 84) Jakarta, Indonesia

Military service
- Allegiance: Indonesia
- Branch/service: Indonesian Army
- Rank: Lieutenant general
- Unit: Kodam III/Siliwangi

Dadang Suprayogi (or Suprajogi, 12 April 1914 – 13 September 1998) was an Indonesian military officer and politician. He served in the Indonesian Army, primarily in Kodam III/Siliwangi, before he was appointed minister under Sukarno in 1958. He served as minister of production, and later minister of public works, until 1966. Afterwards, he chaired the Audit Board of Indonesia for a time before participating and leading sports organizations in Indonesia, including heading the National Sports Committee of Indonesia and representing the country in the International Olympic Committee.

== Early life and education ==
Suprayogi was born in Bandung on 12 April 1914. He studied at a Middelbare Handelsschool (equivalent of a high school) there, majoring in economics.

== Career ==
=== Early and military career ===
He began working as a clerk at Bandung's municipal government in 1935 until the Japanese takeover in 1942, during which he was promoted to financial inspector for the city. After the Japanese surrender, he joined the newly formed People's Security Agency (BKR) as part of its local leadership in Bandung. During the Indonesian National Revolution, he was part of the Siliwangi Division which largely operated in Western Java, where he held various positions including chief of logistics and special chief of staff. After the war ended, he served in several other positions in the army, until he was the army's quartermaster general by 1955.

As a lieutenant colonel, he was appointed Siliwangi Division's commander-in-chief in August 1956, replacing Alexander Evert Kawilarang. Many officers of the Siliwangi Division at the time were considering launching a coup against the government in order to "improve the affairs of state", and one of Suprayogi's first actions was to gather regimental and battalion officers to convince them against backing such coups in late September 1955. A number of Siliwangi officers, namely Kemal Idris, were later removed by Suprayogi as they made a continued futile attempt to gather support for a coup, including leading a regiment to head towards Jakarta before they were intercepted by other Siliwangi units and was forced to turn back without a fight.

=== Government minister ===
His first ministerial appointment was on 25 June 1958 while he held the rank of colonel, as State Minister for Economic Stabilization in the Djuanda Cabinet. In the succeeding First Working Cabinet, he was appointed a full Minister of Production, and in the Second Working Cabinet he had been promoted to brigadier general while maintaining his ministerial post. The Third Working Cabinet saw Suprayogi's office being elevated to Coordinating Minister, at a time when he had been promoted to major general. He also held a secondary office as Minister of Public Works and Power in the Third Working Cabinet.

During Suprayogi's tenure as public works minister, he oversaw several large-scale projects such as the construction of the Jatiluhur Dam, the Ngurah Rai Airport, the Ampera Bridge, and construction in Jakarta related to the 1962 Asian Games (such as the Semanggi Interchange and the Senayan Sports Complex). In the Fourth Working Cabinet, Suprayogi would no longer serve as coordinating minister, though Suprayogi remained public works minister. He maintained his office in the Dwikora Cabinet, but was replaced by Sutami in the Revised Dwikora Cabinet.

Suprayogi was appointed chairman of the Audit Board of Indonesia (BPK) in 1966. The Audit Board had previously been largely ineffective under Sukarno's presidency due to presidential control, and it did not begin investigating smaller cases of corruption until 1967. He remained chairman until his replacement by Umar Wirahadikusumah in 1973.

=== Sports organizations ===
During his tenure as minister of production, he was also chairman of the Swimming Association of Indonesia (PRSI) and within this capacity Suprayogi in 1960 proposed a national centralized training system (Indonesian: Pemusatan Latihan Nasional, abbreviated as Pelatnas), which was implemented in the leadup to the 1962 Asian Games. This system later became the core of the Indonesian sports teams in international competitions. He would serve as PRSI's chairman between 1953 and 1983, and he was awarded the title "Father of Indonesian Swimming" during PRSI's 1983 congress. He had stated his intentions to not continue his tenure prior to the congress, as he thought he had held the position for too long.

After concluding his ministerial career in the 1970s, Suprayogi became active in sports, and became daily chairman of the National Sports Committee of Indonesia (KONI), starting from an acting position in May 1973 to replace Hamengkubuwono IX who was appointed vice president. He would serve in this position until 1986. He was also appointed to replace Hamengkubuwono as Indonesia's representative to the International Olympic Committee in 1973, and remained at the IOC until his retirement in 1989.

== Death ==
He died in Jakarta on 13 September 1998 and was buried at Kalibata Heroes' Cemetery. His death was caused by complications from a number of diseases he had. During his last years, he was used a walking stick or wheelchair, and still made visits to athletes' training camps as late as 1997.

== Awards ==
- Commander of the Legion of Honour (1969)

== Bibliography ==
- McVey, Ruth (1971). "The Post-Revolutionary Transformation of the Indonesian Army". Indonesia. 11 (11): 131–176. doi:10.2307/3350748. hdl:1813/53507. JSTOR 3350748.
- Susunan Kabinet R.I. Tahun 1945 S/d 1968 (in Indonesian). Biro Penjusunan dan Pembuatan Program, Departemen Penerangan. 1968.
