= Second Working Cabinet =

Second Working Cabinet may refer to:

- Second Working Cabinet (Sukarno)
- Second Working Cabinet (Joko Widodo)
