= Sahardjo =

Indonesian politician (1909–1963)

Dr. Sahardjo
- Sketch of Sahardjo, from the Encyclopedia of Jakarta

11th Minister of Justice of Indonesia
- In office 10 July 1959 – 1963
- President: Sukarno
- Preceded by: Gustaaf A. Maengkom
- Succeeded by: Astrawinata

Personal details
- Born: 26 June 1909 Surakarta, Dutch East Indies
- Died: 13 November 1963 (aged 54)
- Resting place: Kalibata Heroes' Cemetery
- Citizenship: Indonesian

Dr. Sahardjo LL.B., (EYD: Saharjo; 26 June 1909 – 13 November 1963) was a National Hero and Minister of Justice of Indonesia during the First, Second, and Third Working Cabinets.

== Biography ==
Sahardjo was born in Surakarta, Dutch East Indies on 26 June 1909. After dropping out from medical school, he went on to study law, graduating with a bachelor's degree in 1941. At first he taught at a private school, but he then became active in politics, joining and eventually leading the Indonesian Party (Partai Indonesia). He participated in framing the 1947 citizenship law and the 1953 law on public elections.

Dr Sahardjo served as Minister of Justice for three periods. His first period was during the First Working Cabinet, from 10 July 1959 to 18 February 1960. His second was during the Second Working Cabinet, from 18 February 1960 to 6 March 1962, and his third was during the Third Working Cabinet, from 6 March 1962 to 13 November 1963; during the Third Working Cabinet he was also Deputy Prime Minister / Coordinator of the Interior. During Sahardjo's time as Minister of Justice, there was also "fierce but publicly muted" debate regarding legal fundamentals such as nulla poena sine lege ('no penalty without a law'). Together with Chief Justice of the Supreme Court Wirjono Prodjodikoro, he argued for greater protection of the freedoms of criminals and suspects; this eventually won general support, as the populace was displeased with the poor performance of Prosecutor General Goenawan.

Sahardjo and Prodjodikoro moved to civil law reform in 1962, with Sahardjo proposing that both civil and commercial codes, remnants from the colonial period, be rescinded completely. This proposal, supported by Prodjodikoro and several members of the law community, was heavily opposed by advocates and judges; the advocates and judges argued that it would increase legal uncertainty, while Prodjodikoro argued that little would change as much had already been replaced. Sahardjo's preferred legal institution would be free of the "discriminatory" remnants of colonial law and included modified adat (traditional) laws—provided that they had been brought in line with the state philosophy of Pancasila. Although Prodjodikoro eventually rescinded several articles of the code, Lev notes that practices did not change much.

The following year, he chose the banyan, an old Javanese symbol for justice, to replace a blindfolded woman holding scales as the symbol of the ministry; it was inscribed with the Javanese word pengajoman, meaning "protection and succor". According to Daniel S. Lev, an American scholar on Indonesian law, the change from European to Javanese symbology represented a return to tradition and "quickening" of the evolution from Dutch to Indonesian law. He also changed the designation of prisons from penjara ('jail') to Lembaga Permasyarakatan Khusus ('Special Civics Institutions'), arguing that prisons were places for reformation and not torture. Sahardjo died on 13 November 1963 and was buried in Kalibata Heroes' Cemetery.

== Legacy ==
Scholar on Indonesian legal history Sebastiaan Pompe writes critically of Sahardjo, saying that he "actively destroyed the law in the name of prevailing revolutionary ideology, making himself obsolete in the process."

A street named after Sahardjo is located in Tebet, South Jakarta, running from Manggarai to Pancoran.
