= Mohammad Yamin =

Indonesian poet, revolutionary, and politician (1903–1962)

Muhammad Yamin
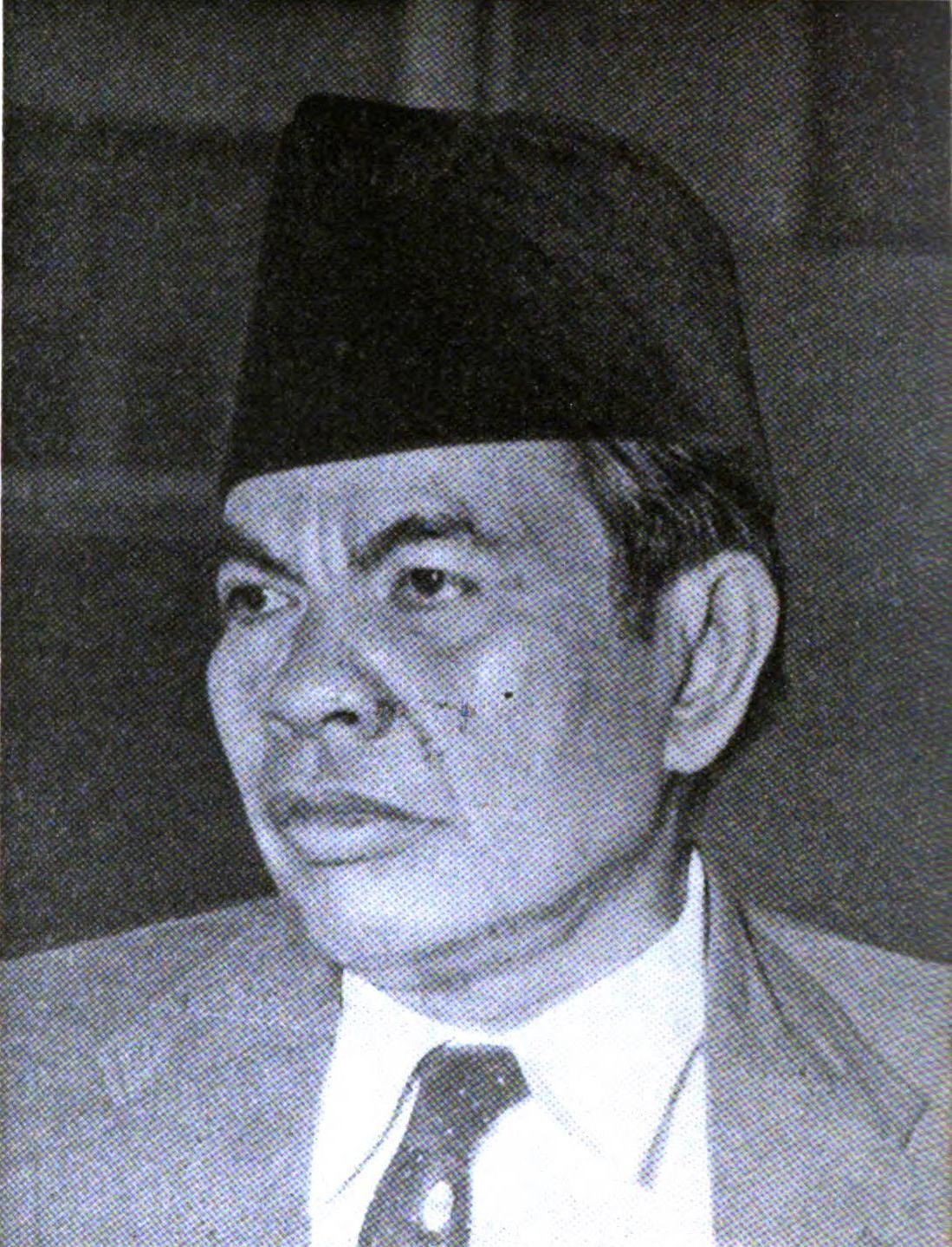
- Mohammad Yamin in 1954

14th Minister of Information
- In office 6 March 1962 – 17 October 1962
- President: Sukarno
- Preceded by: Maladi
- Succeeded by: Roeslan Abdulgani

8th Minister of National Education
- In office 30 July 1953 – 12 August 1955
- President: Sukarno
- Preceded by: Bahder Djohan
- Succeeded by: R.M. Suwandi

6th Minister of Law
- In office 27 April 1951 – 3 April 1952
- President: Sukarno
- Preceded by: Wongsonegoro
- Succeeded by: Lukman Wiriadinata

Personal details
- Born: 24 August 1903 Sawahlunto, West Sumatra, Dutch East Indies
- Died: 17 October 1962 (aged 59) Jakarta, Indonesia

Muhammad Yamin (24 August 1903 – 17 October 1962) was an Indonesian poet, politician, historian and national hero who played a key role in the writing of the draft preamble to the 1945 constitution.

== Early life and education ==
Yamin was born on 24 August 1903 in Talawi, Sawahlunto on the island of Sumatra, Indonesia. He was educated at Dutch schools for natives, firstly at a Hollandsch-Inlandsche School, then at an Algemene Middelbare School in Jogyakarta. In 1932 he obtained a law degree in Jakarta.

In the early 1930s, Yamin was active in journalist circles, joining the editorial board of the newspaper Panorama, together with Liem Koen Hian, Sanusi Pane, and Amir Sjarifuddin. In mid-1936, together with his colleagues Liem, Pane, and Sjarifuddin, Yamin started another newspaper, Kebangoenan (1936–1941), which—as with Panorama—was published by Phoa Liong Gie's Siang Po Printing Press.

== Literature ==
Yamin began his literary career as a writer in the 1920s when Indonesian poetry was marked by an intense and largely reflective romanticism. He was a pioneer in that art form.

Yamin started to write in Malay in the Dutch-language journal Jong Sumatra, the literary publication of the Jong Sumatranen Bond, a semi-political organization of Sumatran youth. Yamin's early works were tied to the clichés used in classical Malay. He debuted as a poet with "Tanah Air" ('motherland') in 1922. It was the first collection of modern Malay verse to be published. Quoted below is the first stanza of "Tanah Air", his ode to the natural beauty of the highlands in present West Sumatra:

Di atas batasan Bukit Barisan
Memandang beta ke bawah memandang
Tampaklah hutan rimba dan ngarai
lagi pun sawah, telaga nan permai :
Serta gerangan lihatlah pula
Langit yang hijau bertukar warna
Oleh pucuk daun kelapa :
Itulah tanah airku
Sumatera namanya tumpah darahku.

Translation:

Above the limits of Bukit Barisan
I gaze below, looking
Forests, jungles, and valleys are visible
As well as rice fields, beautiful lakes:
And then, behold
The green sky changing colors
By the tips of coconut leaves:
That is my homeland
Sumatra, the land where my blood was spilled.

In the above poem, one imagines Yamin standing on the hills near the town of Bukittinggi, the site of the prehistoric canyon now verdant with rainforest and paddy fields. Note that he refers to Sumatera, specifically the part that is called the Alam Minangkabau which lies on the western part of the large island, as his land and water (tanah airku) as well as that to which he will defend with his blood (tumpah darahku), and not Indonesia as it became independent in 1945. This may reflect the early development of his concept of nationhood.

The credit for the first important modern prose in Malay belongs to his fellow Minangkabau, Marah Roesli, author of the novel Sitti Nurbaya which also appeared in 1922. Rusli's work enjoyed years of great popularity.

Yamin's second collection, Tumpah Darahku, appeared on 28 October 1928. The date was historically important because it was on that date that Yamin and his fellow nationalists recited an oath: One Country, One Nation, One Language, popularly known as the Youth's Oath (Sumpah Pemuda). The date is celebrated as a national holiday in Indonesia. His play, Ken Arok dan Ken Dedes, which took its subjects from Java's history Pararaton, appeared in one of the 1934 issues of Poedjangga Baroe, the only literary publication that featured the rebuke to the predominantly Dutch-speaking indigenous intellectuals. His compatriots included Roestam Effendi, Sanusi Pané, and Sutan Takdir Alisjahbana, founders of Poedjangga Baroe.

In his poetry, Yamin made much use of the sonnet form, borrowed from Dutch literature. At that time among the major writers was the national activist Abdul Muis (1898–1959), whose central theme was the interaction of Indonesian and European value systems. In 1936 Pandji Tisna's (1908–1978) Sukreni: Gadis Bali, possibly the most original work of pre-independence fiction, dealt with the destructive effect of contemporary commercial ethics on Balinese society. Distinctly innovative poetry had appeared in the 1910s. The European sonnet form was especially popular, but the influence of traditional verse forms remained strong. Although Yamin experimented with Malay in his poetry, he upheld the classical norms of the language more than the younger generation of writers. Yamin also published plays, essays, historical novels, and poems, and translated works from such authors as Shakespeare (Julius Caesar) and Rabindranath Tagore.

== Political life ==
Yamin was the leader of the Jong Sumatranen Bond (Association of Sumatran Youth) from 1926 to 1928, and also Indonesia Muda (Indonesian Youth) in 1928. . He then became an active member of the Association of Indonesian Students (PPPI) and the Indonesia Party (Partindo). Upon the dissolution of Partindo, Yamin was one of the founders of the Indonesian People's Movement (Gerindo) in May 1937 along with A. K. Gani and Amir Sjarifuddin. Gerindo aimed to raise public consciousness of nationalist ideas by organizing the people. Gerindo's founding, however, also reflected a growing willingness on the part of many left-wing nationalists to cooperate with the Dutch. This willingness arose both from despair over the prospects for organizing effective nationalist resistance in the face of Dutch military and police power and from a conviction that collaboration against fascism (especially Japanese fascism) had the highest priority in world affairs. Gerindo hoped that through cooperation the Dutch would establish a separate legislature in the colonial territory. Yamin was expelled from the organization in 1939 for breaches of regulations, including campaigning against another Gerindo candidate in the Batavia municipal council elections. He then established the Party of Indonesian Unity (Parpindo). In 1939, Yamin became a member of the Volksraad, an advisory body created in 1917 by the Dutch in the Netherlands East Indies.

Within the Vollksraad, Yamin divided the National Fraction grouping of Indonesian members led by Mohammad Husni Thamrin, by enticing non-Javanese members away, damaging the unity of the nationalists. He then formed the National Indonesia Group (Goni), which was chaired by Mangaradja Soeangkoepon, and also included Abdul Rasjid and Tadjuddin Noor. Yamin subsequently claimed that he and his new colleagues had been unhappy with Parindra members dominating the National Fraction. As a reprisal for its refusal to admit him as a member, Yamin then tried to undermine the united front of the Indonesian Political Federation (Gapi) by separately petitioning the Dutch authorities for an Indonesian parliament on behalf of his Parindo party.

Shortly before the Japanese attack on Java, Amir Sjarifuddin received funds from the Dutch authorities to organize underground resistance. This movement was quickly ended by the Japanese. Gerindo, like all other organizations, was banned. Gerindo's policy of cooperation with the Dutch prefigured the postwar strategy of the Socialist Party — including that of Amir Sjarifuddin, defense minister and later prime minister of the Indonesian Republic — in making far-reaching concessions to the Dutch to obtain international recognition of Indonesia's sovereignty.

During the Japanese occupation (1942–1945), Yamin was appointed to the advisory board of the Center for People's Power (Pusat Tenaga Rakyat - PUTERA), a Japanese-sponsored confederation of nationalist organizations. Putera was established on 9 March 1943, with Sukarno as chairman. Concurrent with his role in Putera's advisory board, Yamin was appointed a senior official at the Sendenbu (the Japanese Propaganda Office).

== Involvement in drafting the constitution ==
Yamin was also one of the sixty-two founding members of the Japanese-established Investigating Committee for Preparatory Work for Independence (BPUPK). He suggested to the body that the new nation should include all the Malay-speaking world: not only the territories of the Netherlands Indies, but also Sarawak, Sabah, Malaya, and Portuguese Timor. Yamin later claimed that on 29 May 1945, he delivered a speech on certain philosophical and political foundations for the proposed new nation and enumerated five principles for the nation, which came to be known as Pancasila and were later incorporated in the Preamble of the 1945 Constitution. This would have been two days before Sukarno's speech outlining Pancasila on 1 June.

Yamin's claim of authorship for Pancasila was questioned by Dr. Mohammad Hatta, Mr. Subarjo, Mr. A. Maramis, Prof. A.G. Pringgodigdo, Prof. Sunario, and all of the surviving members of BPUPK who were subsequently interviewed. However, the fact that Yamin was seemingly the only person to possess complete records of the BPUPK sessions, which he used for his 1959 book Naskah persiapan Undang-undang Dasar 1945 (Documents for the preparation of the 1945 Constitution) was particularly useful for the New Order regime, which took power in Indonesia following the coup attempt of September 1965. As part of the de-Sukanoization process to discredit the former regime, it was in the interests of the government to claim that Yamin had come up with the Pancasila concept and that Sukarno was simply the first person to use the term 'Pancasila'. To this end, Nugroho Notosusanto, the official historian, used Yamin's 1959 work as the basis of an official book to reinforce this claim.

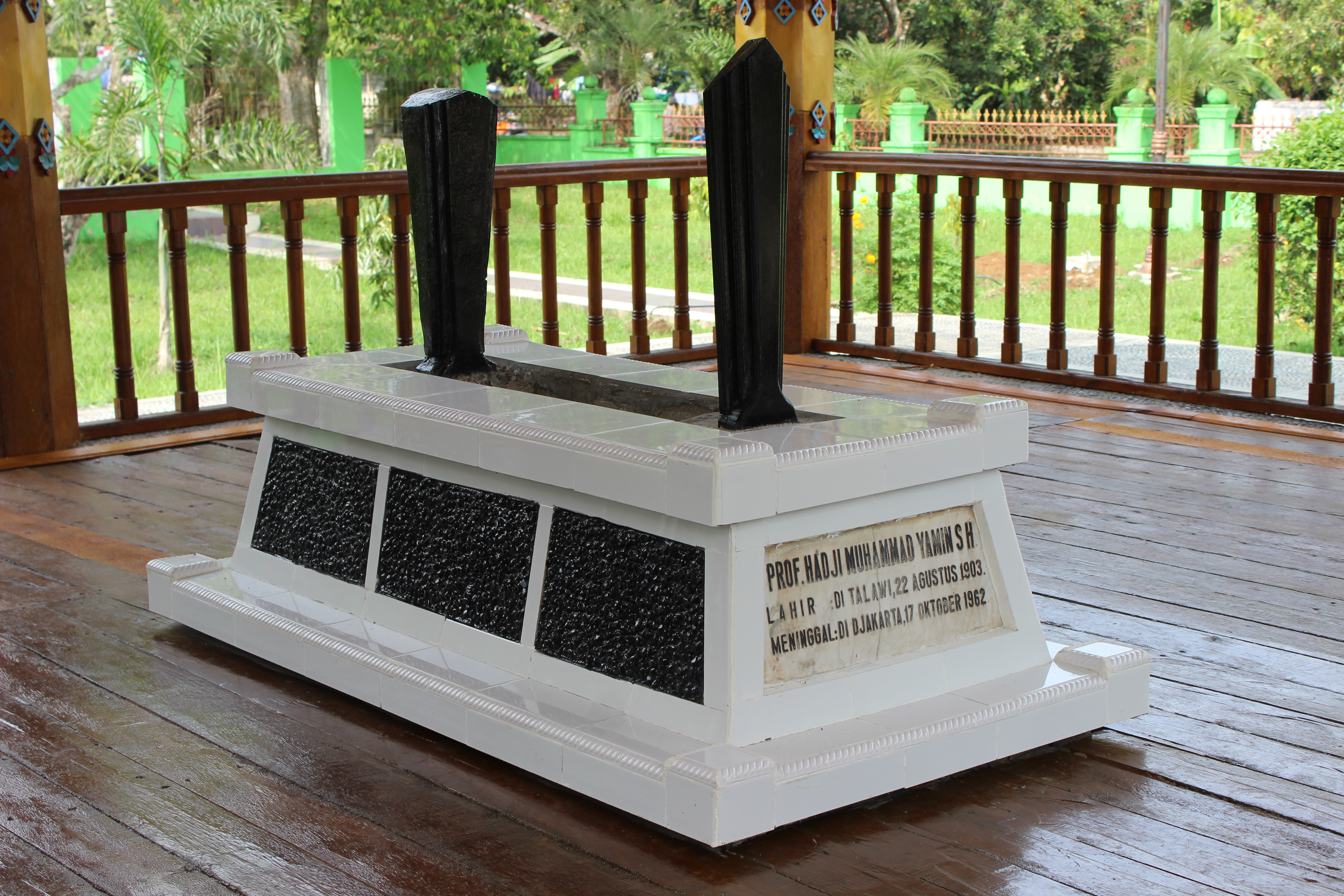
Tomb of Yamin in Talawi

Yamin was a member of the Committee of Nine (Panintia Sembilan) tasked with beginning to draft a constitution. This committee produced the preamble, which incorporated the essence of Sukarno's 1 June speech. Yamin, who did much of the work in producing this draft, called it the Jakarta Charter. When the BPUPK met for its second session, on 10 July, a committee of 19 members, with Soepomo playing the major role, produced the draft constitution over three days. Yamin was disappointed at not being appointed to this committee and refused to accept his appointment to a different committee that discussed financial matters. When the draft constitution was put to a vote on 16 July, Yamin criticised it and was the only BPUPK member who did not immediately accept it. Yamin subsequently claimed that he had produced a draft constitution that was very similar to Soepomo's version, but there is no evidence for this, and Hatta specifically denied that Yamin had presented such a document to the BPUPK.

On 17 August 1945, Sukarno proclaimed Indonesian independence and the next day, the Preparatory Committee for Indonesian Independence (PPKI) met and tasked a commission of seven: Sukarno, Mohammad Hatta, Soepomo, Subardjo, Otto Iskandardinata, Yamin and Wongsonegoro to produce a final version of the Constitution.

Yamin served in the cabinet of successive, post-colonial administrations, notably as Minister of Education and Culture (1953–1955) in the First Ali Sastroamidjojo Cabinet, Minister without portfolio (1957–1959) in the Djuanda Cabinet, Minister for Social Affairs and Culture (1959–1960) in the First Working Cabinet, Minister and deputy director of the National Planning Board (BAPPENAS)(1960–1962) in the Second Working Cabinet and Deputy Prime Minister, Minister of Information and Director of BAPPENAS (1962 until his death) in the Third Working Cabinet.

== Personality ==
Although Yamin was intelligent, he had a reputation for overstating his accomplishments, and for being argumentative. Thamrin referred to him as "the eternal splitter" because of his confrontational attitude in the Volksraad. As well as his false claim to have come up with the concept of Pancasila in a speech at the BPUPK on 29 May 1945, when he was minister of culture in the First Ali Sastroamidjojo Cabinet from 1953 to 1955, Yamin claimed to have led the restoration of the Borobudur temple. A plaque that he ordered installed on the temple claiming he played a key role was removed once Yamin was no longer culture minister. Indonesia's first vice-president, Mohammad Hatta called Yamin 'crafty' (licik).

== Death and legacy ==
Yamin died in Jakarta on 17 October 1962. The originator of significant ideas, Yamin dominated modern Indonesian political and cultural history. His ideas contributed to the political awakening and the surge in national pride in Indonesia. In 1973, he was proclaimed a National Hero of Indonesia. In 2015, a species of fossil fish, Ombilinichthys yamini, was named after Yamin after being discovered in his hometown.

== Selected works ==
- Tanah Air, 1922
- Indonesia, Tumpah Darahku, 1928
- Ken Arok dan Ken Dedes, 1934
- Sedjarah Perdjoeangan Dipanegara (History of the Dipanegara Wars), 1945
- Gadjah Mada (history of the Majapahit prime minister), 1948
- Revolusi Amerika (American Revolution), 1951
- Tatanegara Majapahit (7 volumes), an exposition of the administration of the Majapahit Empire (5th to 14th century AD).
- Naskah-naskah Persiapan Undang-undang Dasar, 1959 - a compendium and commentary on the proceedings of the deliberations leading to the promulgation of the 1945 Constitution
- Proklamasi dan Konstitusi Republik Indonesia (The Proclamation of Independence and the Constitution of the Republic of Indonesia), 1951
- Kebudayaan Asia Afrika (The Asian and African Cultures), 1955
