= Indonesian Red Cross Society =

National Red Cross Society in Indonesia

Indonesian Red Cross Society Palang Merah Indonesia
- Abbreviation: PMI
- Formation: 17 September 1945; 81 years ago
- Type: Non-governmental organization
- Legal status: Foundation
- Purpose: Humanitarianism
- Headquarters: Jakarta
- Location: Indonesia
- Region served: Indonesia
- Official language: Indonesian
- Chairman: Jusuf Kalla
- Staff: 105 staff, including 17 expatriates
- Website: pmi.or.id

The Indonesian Red Cross Society (Indonesian: Palang Merah Indonesia, PMI) is a humanitarian organization in Indonesia. It is a member of International Federation of Red Cross and Red Crescent Societies.

Indonesia is one of the few Muslim-majority countries to use the Red Cross as its symbol. Indonesia is not a strictly faith-based nation.

In mid-2013, the Indonesian Red Cross Society had 32,568 people in its Volunteer Corps, 19,294 Individual Volunteers and 893,381 Blood Donor Volunteers, for a total of 945,243 persons, which is recorded as the highest number of volunteers in the world.

== History ==
The IRCS was created on 17 September 1945, exactly one month after Indonesia's independence. President Sukarno ordered its inception when a battle between Indonesian soldiers and allied troops broke out, leaving many wounded, on 3 September 1945. Based on the performance, IRCS received an international recognition in 1950 that it was accepted as a member of the International Red Cross and achieved its legal status through Presidential Decree Number 25 of 1959, which was later reinforced by Presidential Decree Number 245 of 1963.

== Location ==
The IRCS central headquarters is located at Jl. Jenderal Gatot Soebroto Kav. 96, Jakarta.

== Programs ==
=== ICBRR ===
ICBRR stands for Integrated Community Based Risk Reduction Program. It is a program currently being implemented in Indonesia, funded by the International Federation Red Cross (IFRC) and in cooperation with the Danish Red Cross (DRC) and PMI. It is being conducted in 11 branches in Central Java and Yogyakarta. Six branches in Central Java are Klaten, Magelang, Boyolali, Temanggung, Purowrejo and Karanganyar. 5 branches in Yogyakarta consist of Kota Yogyakarta, Bantul, Sleman, Gunung Kidul and Kulon Progo.

The program started by making a program document and MoU between IFRC, DRC and PMI. The objective of the program is to strengthen the capacity of the community in facing disasters by reducing the risk and strengthening the capacity of PMI to assist with in the communities in response to a disaster.

== Chairpersons ==
1. Mohammad Hatta (1945–1946)
2. Mas Sutardjo Kertohadikusumo (1946–1948)
3. Bendoro Pangeran Haryo (BPH) Bintoro (1948–1952)
4. Bahder Djohan (1952–1954)
5. Paku Alam VIII (1954–1966)
6. Basuki Rahmat (1966–1969)
7. Satrio (1970–1982)
8. Suyoso Sumodimejo (1982–1986)
9. Ibnu Sutowo (1986–1992)
10. Siti Hardiyanti Rukmana (1992–1998)
11. Mar'ie Muhammad (1998–2009)
12. Jusuf Kalla (2009–present)

== See also ==
- List of Red Cross and Red Crescent Societies
- ICBRR
