= Wahib Wahab =

Indonesian politician

Kyai Haji Muhammad Wahib Wahab
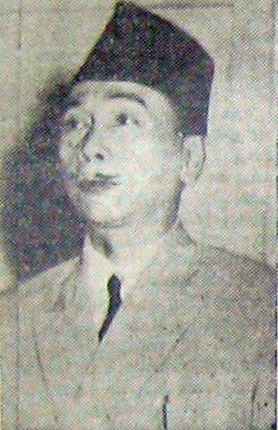
- Wahib Wahab on 26 August 1960

8th Indonesian Minister of Religious Affairs
- In office 10 July 1959 – 6 March 1962
- President: Sukarno
- Preceded by: Muhammad Ilyas
- Succeeded by: KH. Saifuddin Zuhri

Personal details
- Born: November 1, 1918 Rice Embankment, Jombang, East Java, Indonesia
- Died: July 12, 1986 (aged 67) Jakarta, Indonesia
- Party: Nahdlatul Ulama
- Relations: Abdul Wahab Hasbullah (father)

K.H. Muhammad Wahib Wahab (born in Jombang, East Java, Indonesia on November 1, 1918 - died in Jakarta, Indonesia on July 12, 1986, at the age of 67) once served as Minister of Religious Affairs. He was the first son of Wahab Hasbullah one of the founding initiator Nahdlatul Ulama.
