= Wiluyo Puspoyudo =

Indonesian general and politician

Lieutenant General Wiluyo Puspoyudo
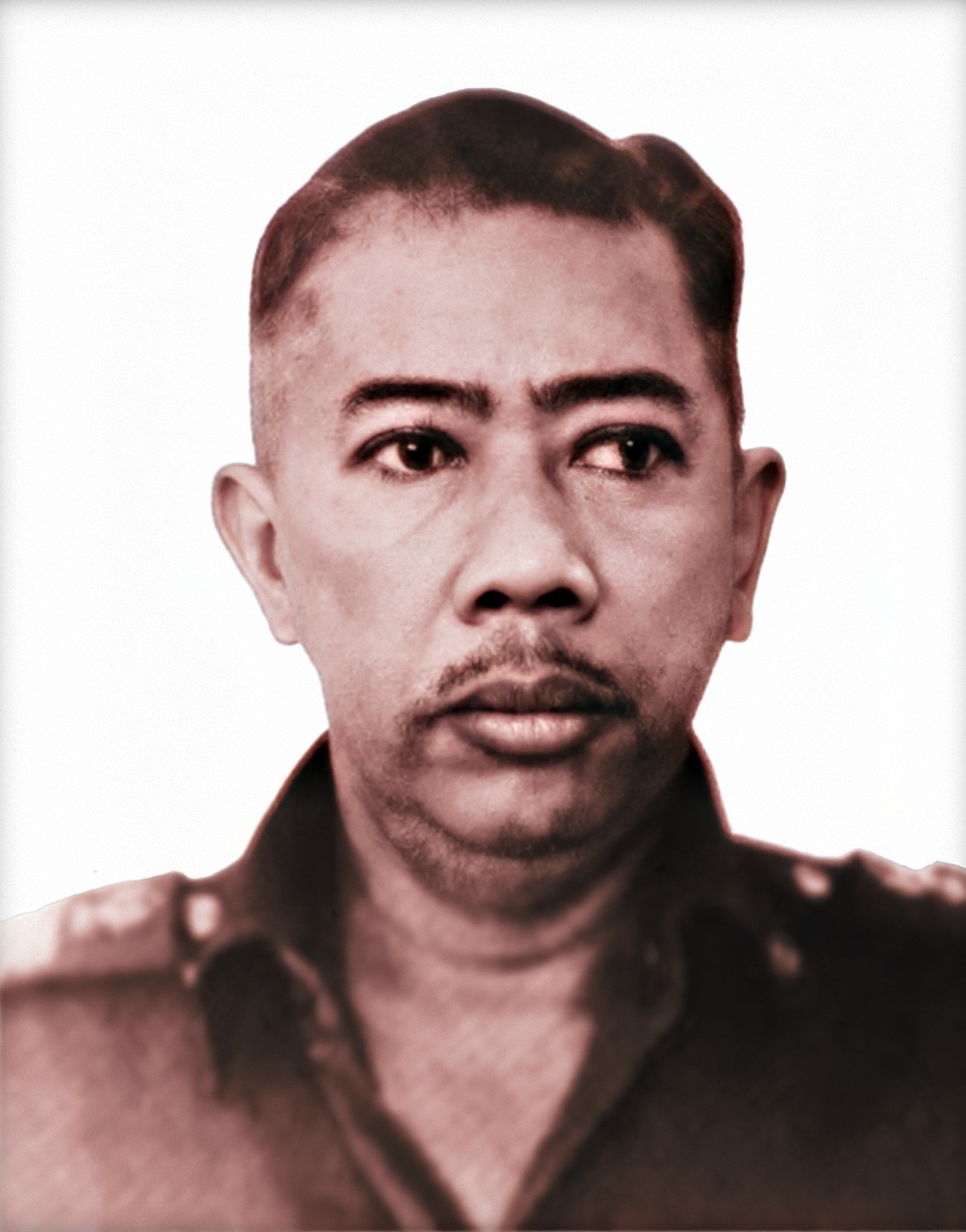

Speaker of the People's Consultative Assembly (Acting)
- In office 18 March 1966 – 20 June 1966
- Deputy: Idham Chalid; Ali Sastroamidjojo
- Succeeded by: Abdul Haris Nasution

Deputy Speaker of the People's Consultative Assembly
- In office 9 November 1960 – 18 March 1966 Serving with Idham Chalid, Ali Sastroamidjojo, D.N. Aidit

Member of the People's Consultative Assembly
- In office 15 September 1960 – 20 June 1966

Member of the People's Representative Council
- In office 25 June 1960 – 27 June 1963

Personal details
- Born: January 9, 1919 Pekalongan, Central Java, Dutch East Indies
- Died: January 9, 1968 (aged 49) Jakarta, Indonesia
- Resting place: Kalibata Heroes' Cemetery

Military service
- Allegiance: Indonesia
- Branch/service: Indonesian Army
- Years of service: 1945–1968
- Rank: Lieutenant General
- Commands: E Brigade of East Kalimantan
- Battles/wars: Indonesian National Revolution

Wiluyo Puspoyudo (9 January 1919 – 9 January 1968) was an Indonesian military figure and politician who became the deputy speaker of the People's Consultative Assembly from 1960 until 1966, and as the acting Speaker of the People's Consultative Assembly in 1966.

== Early life and career ==
Wiluyo Puspoyudo was born on 9 January 1919 in the city of Pekalongan, Central Java.

He began his military career in the Indonesian Army in 1945, when he was put as the commander of the E Brigade in East Kalimantan. During his time as the commander of the E Brigade, the East Kalimantan populace began organizing resistance to the Dutch forces that were occupying East Kalimantan. The organization of the resistance began since 10 December 1946, and was formed in response to the Dutch plan of massacring the East Kalimantan populace in the Fonds Nasional Indonesia field. Puspoyudo managed to negotiated with the Dutch. As a result, the Dutch abandoned their massacre plans.

== Political career ==
On 25 June 1960, he was inaugurated as the member of the People's Representative Council of Mutual Assistance (DPR-GR), and on 15 September 1960, along with other members of the DPR-GR, he was inaugurated as the member of the Provisional People's Consultative Assembly (MPRS). He was later appointed by President Sukarno as the Deputy Speaker of the Provisional People's Consultative Assembly on 9 November 1960.

On 27 June 1963, with a presidential decree, he was dismissed as the member of the People's Representative Council of Mutual Assistance but still retained membership in the Provisional People's Consultative Assembly.

On 18 June 1966, the Speaker of the Provisional People's Consultative Assembly, Chairul Saleh, was arrested by Lieutenant General Suharto. Puspoyudo was elected by the MPRS leadership to temporarily replace Saleh's position. He became the Acting Speaker of the People's Consultative Assembly until the election of Abdul Haris Nasution as the Speaker on 20 June 1966.

He was promoted to Major General, and became the Governor of the National Resilience Institute. He held the office until his death on 9 January 1968. According to his granddaughter, Puspojudo suffered a heart attack due to exhaustion. He was posthumously promoted to Lieutenant General. He received a military funeral at the Kalibata Heroes' Cemetery, which was led by Acting Chief of Staff of the Army Maraden Panggabean.

== Awards ==
Star of Mahaputera, 3rd class (13 September 1965)

== Family ==
Wiluyo Puspoyudo was married, and the marriage resulted in 6 children. Puspoyudo has instructed his children to "get a job outside the armed forces".

== Legacy ==
A monument in Balikpapan, East Kalimantan, which was named after him, was opened in 1992 by Governor HM Ardans. The site of the monument was rumored to be located near Puspoyudo's house during his military service in East Kalimantan. The street near the monument was also named after Puspoyudo.
