= Saifuddin Zuhri =

Indonesian politician (1919–1986)

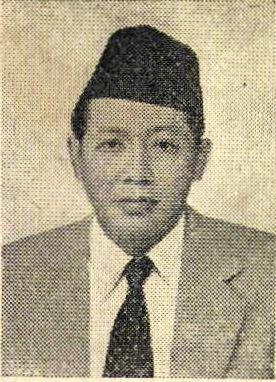

9th Minister of Religious Affairs of the Republic of Indonesia
- In office 6 March 1962 – 17 October 1967
- President: Sukarno
- Preceded by: K.H. M. Wahib Wahab
- Succeeded by: KH. Muhammad Dahlan

Personal details
- Born: 1 October 1919 Kawedanan Sokaraja, Banyumas, Central Java, Dutch East Indies
- Died: 25 March 1986 (aged 66) Indonesia
- Party: Nahdlatul Ulama
- Spouse: Solichah
- Relations: Salahuddin Wahid (son in-law)
- Children: 10, including Lukman

Saifuddin Zuhri (1 October 1919 – 25 March 1986) was an Indonesian politician, journalist, educator and Muslim cleric who was the Minister of Religious Affairs of Indonesia under President Sukarno and Acting President Suharto.

== Early life ==
Zuhri was born in Kawedanan Sokaraja, Banyumas, then of Dutch East Indies. His father Muhammad Zuhri came from religious farmers. His mother Siti Saudatun was the granddaughter of Asraruddin Kiai, an influential cleric of the time who ran a small boarding school in the area.

Zuhri was brought up with a boarding-school education. He entered the youth movement during the Indonesian National Revolution. At age 19 he was elected leader of the Ansor Youth Movement of Nahdlatul Ulama, South Central Java. At the same time, he was elected Consul of the Regional Madrasah Teachers Kedu in Nahdlatul Ulama. Zuhri became a Reuters news agency correspondent and worked for several newspapers and magazines.

== Career ==
At the age of 35, Zuhri was the Secretary General of the Executive Board of the Nahdlatul Ulama, chief editor of the Daily Community Ambassador, and a member of Parliament. President Sukarno made him a member of the Supreme Advisory Council at the age of 39, and then appointed him as Minister of Religion at the age of 43, replacing the resigning KH Wahib Wahab.

During his leadership as Minister of Religion, Islamic higher education in Indonesia rapidly expanded, with the State Islamic Institute (IAIN) developing in nine provinces.

Zuhri participated in the armed and political struggle for Indonesian independence. He help spread Islamic views, such as Ahlus-Sunnah wal Jama'ah, the ideology of nationalism within the framework of an Islamic Indonesia.

Zuhri was appointed Commander of the Division of Central Java Hezbollah and Regional Defense Council Member of Kedu, where he led Hezbollah paramilitary forces to come together under the leadership of Col. TKR. Sudirman, and various other people. Zuhri fought a battle at Ambarawa and received the "Honorary Signs Star Guerilla" award for his efforts from the President and Commander-in-Chief of the Indonesian Armed Forces on January 4, 1965. For his efforts, Zuhri was given land grants, which he donated to local scholars to build Islamic schools on.

== Death and legacy ==
Zuhri wrote a book called Leaving From Boarding School, which was finished on 10 September 1985, about six months before his death, February 25, 1986. Leaving From Boarding School was published in 1987. On October 3, 1989, Zuhri was posthumously awarded the Main Book category Adult Reading Humanities field from the Minister of Education and Culture.

State Islamic Institute of Purwokerto elevated and renamed into his name and become Professor Kiai Haji Saifuddin Zuhri State Islamic University of Purwokerto (Indonesian: Universitas Islam Negeri Profesor Kiai Haji Saifuddin Zuhri Purwokerto) on 11 May 2021 by Presidential Decree No. 41/2021.

== Honors ==
At the age of 45, Zuhri was inaugurated as an Extraordinary Professor in the field of Da'wah by IAIN Sunan Kalidjaga Yogyakarta.
