= Maladi =

Indonesian footballer and politician

Raden Maladi
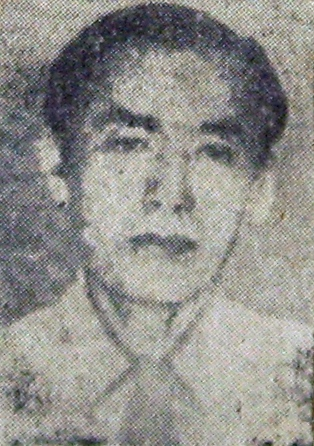
- Maladi, 1960

13th Minister of Information of Indonesia
- In office 10 July 1959 – 6 March 1962
- President: Sukarno
- Preceded by: Sudibjo
- Succeeded by: Mohammad Yamin

Minister of Sports of Indonesia
- In office 6 March 1962 – 27 March 1966
- President: Sukarno

Personal details
- Born: 31 August 1912 Surakarta, Dutch East Indies
- Died: 30 April 2001 (aged 88) Jakarta, Indonesia
- Resting place: Kalibata Heroes' Cemetery
- Citizenship: Indonesian
- Spouse: Siti Khadijah
- Children: 9

Raden Maladi (31 August 1912 – 30 April 2001) was an Indonesian athlete, songwriter, and politician. Interested in football from a young age, Maladi played in the Indonesian leagues beginning in 1930. In the 1940s he dabbled in songwriting and broadcasting before joining the pemuda troops during the Indonesian National Revolution. After a period heading the Football Association of Indonesia, he was selected as Minister of Information and, later, Minister of Sports.

== Early life ==
Maladi was born in Surakarta, Central Java, on 31 August 1912. He was interested in football from a young age, playing as a goalkeeper. In 1930 he started with PSIM Yogyakarta, transferring to Persebaya Surabaya three years later and eventually becoming one of the top players in the league. He also played on the Indonesia national football team, using several pseudonyms. He also enjoyed refereeing games.

By the 1940s Maladi, by then a teacher and already experienced in radio broadcasting, had begun composing works in the kroncong style. During the national revolution Maladi fought in the pemuda, reaching the rank of major before retiring at the end of the revolution in 1949; he was a leader of the four-day general offensive in Surakarta early in the revolution. Towards the end of the war he worked to bring information of the revolution to Indonesian nationals abroad. During this period he also worked as a broadcaster for the radio network RRI (Radio Republik Indonesia) in Surakarta.

Beginning in 1951 he served as chairman of the Football Association of Indonesia, overseeing the organization's change in names and bringing in coach Tony Pogacnik for the national team. Under Pogacnik, the Indonesian football team played the Soviet Union to a draw at the 1956 Summer Olympics in Melbourne. He also became involved in the Olympics, supervising Indonesia's first delegation at the 1952 Summer Olympics in Helsinki, Finland, as well as the delegation at the 1956 Olympics. Maladi left the position in 1959, when he moved to Jakarta, but remained an honorary board member.

== Government minister and death ==
In Jakarta Maladi became the director general of RRI while serving as Minister of Information in the Second Working Cabinet, beginning on 10 July 1959; he had grown to be a close confidante of President Sukarno, and had held the post of deputy minister in the previous cabinet. While Minister of Information he helped spearhead the growth of television in the nation; he had been pushing for television to be introduced in the country since 1952, and the first broadcast on TVRI (Televisi Republik Indonesia) was on 24 August 1962, after ten months of preparations by Maladi and the ministry. It was used to broadcast the 1962 Asian Games, which Maladi had helped organize.

On 6 March 1962 Maladi was made Minister of Sports in the Third Working Cabinet, before the television program came to fruit. Aside from the Asian Games, Maladi supervised the Games of the New Emerging Forces, meant to counteract the perceived colonial presence of the Olympics. He survived several reshuffles before the post was dissolved in the Second Revised Dwikora Cabinet on 27 March 1966.

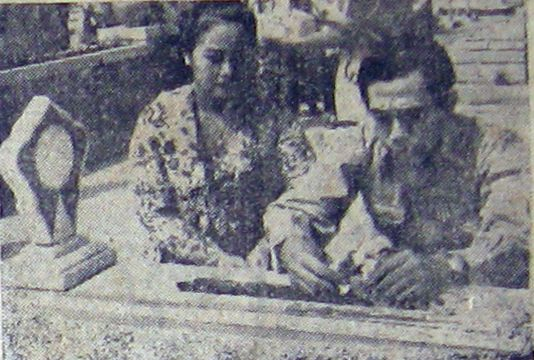
Maladi and his wife visiting the grave of General Sudirman during a trip to Yogyakarta

Maladi died on 30 April 2001 after spending two weeks in intensive care for breathing difficulties at Medistra Hospital in Jakarta. He was later buried in Kalibata Heroes' Cemetery. He was survived by his wife Siti Khadijah and nine children.

== Legacy ==
Maladi received several awards from the Indonesian government during his lifetime, including the Bintang Gerilya, Bintang Kemerdekaan, and Mahaputra (Kelas Tiga., III) For his dedication to sports, the International Olympic Committee awarded Maladi the Bronze Olympic Order in 1983; as of 2005 he is one of only three Indonesians to have received the honor. R. Maladi Stadium (formerly Sriwedari Stadium) in Surakarta is named after him; Maladi had designed it.

The Indonesian singer Chrisye covered Maladi's song "Di Bawah Sinar Bulan Purnama" for his 2002 album Dekade; the singer told The Jakarta Post that he had been inspired to make the cover album after singing "Di Bawah Sinar Bulan Purnama" in 1996 and realising that the song, which he described as a masterpiece, was not recognised by the younger generation. The band Naif covered it for the 2009 film Ruma Maida.

== Compositions ==
A partial list of songs composed by Maladi.

- "Biola Tiga Satu Suara" ("Three Violins, One Voice")
- "Di Bawah Sinar Bulan Purnama" ("Under the Light of the Full Moon")
- "Di Sela-Sela Rumput Hijau" ("Amongst the Green Grass")
- "Nyiur Hijau" ("Green Palm Leaves")
- "Rangkaian Melati" ("Jasmine Arrangement")
- "Solo Di Waktu Malam Hari" ("Surakarta in the Evening")
- "Telaga Biru" ("Blue Lake")

Government offices
Preceded by Subidjo	Minister of Information of the Republic of Indonesia; 1959–1962	Succeeded by Mohammad Yamin
New creation Previously dissolved in 1949	Minister of Sports of the Republic of Indonesia; 1962–1966	Dissolved until 1978
Sporting positions
Preceded by Artono Martosoewignyo	Chairman of Football Association of Indonesia; 1950–1959	Succeeded by Abdul Wahab Djojohadikoesoemo
