= Satrio =

Indonesian doctor and health minister

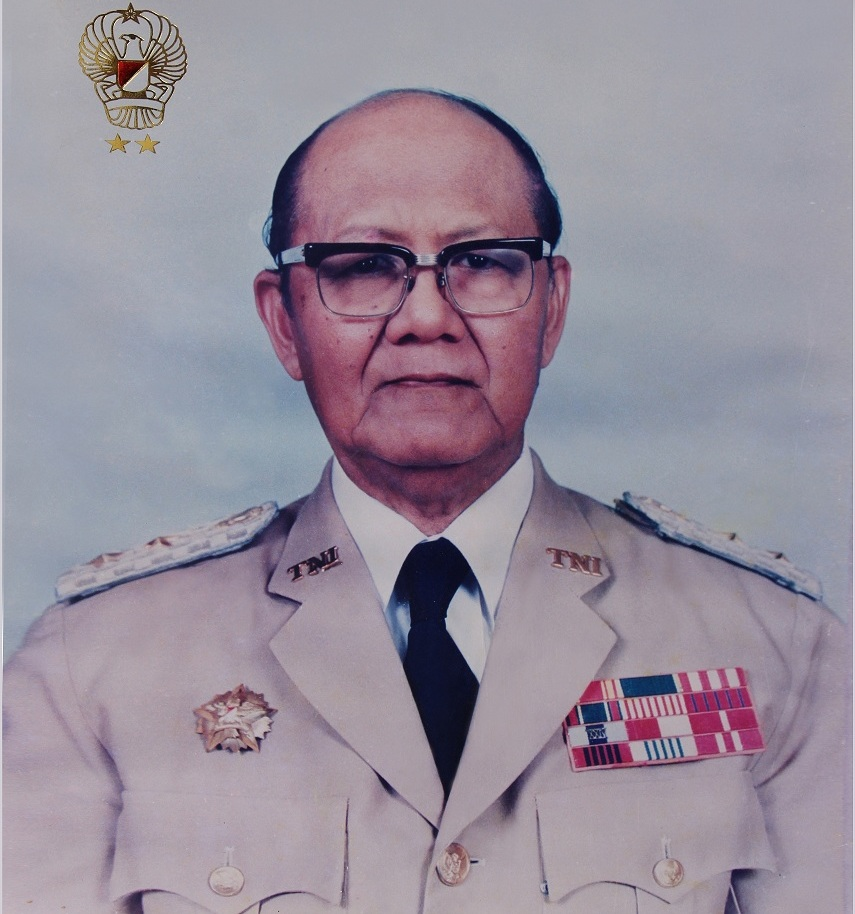

Minister of Health
- In office 10 July 1959 – 25 July 1966
- President: Sukarno
- Preceded by: Abdul Azis Saleh
- Succeeded by: G. A. Siwabessy

Personal details
- Born: 28 May 1916 Banyuwangi, Dutch East Indies (now East Java, Indonesia)
- Died: 5 May 1986 (aged 69) Bandung, West Java, Indonesia

Military service
- Allegiance: Indonesia
- Years of service: 1945–1970
- Rank: Major general
- Commands: Surgeon General of the Armed Forces

Satrio (28 May 1916 – 5 May 1986) was an Indonesian military doctor. He served as Minister of Health during the Guided Democracy period, between 1959 and 1966, and as General Chairman of the Indonesian Red Cross between 1970 and 1982.

A graduate of the Batavia Medical College during the Japanese occupation period, Satrio was an early member of the Indonesian Red Cross during the Indonesian National Revolution, active in Jakarta, Banten and West Java as a military doctor. After the revolution, he continued his career as an army doctor until his appointment as health minister. After a seven-year ministerial tenure, he returned to military service before heading the Indonesian Red Cross.

== Early life and education ==
Satrio was born on 28 May 1916 in the village of Singojuruh within Banyuwangi Regency, today in East Java. He was the eldest of eight children, with his father working as a teacher. He completed his HIS elementary school there, before moving to Surabaya for his MULO middle school, then to Malang for AMS. He continued his studies in Batavia, where he took a medical course at the Geneeskundige Hoogeschool te Batavia (Batavia Medical College) from which he graduated in 1942. During his studies at Malang, he had joined the local chapter of the Jong Islamieten Bond.

== Career ==
After graduating during the Japanese occupation period, Satrio began to work as a doctor's assistant. When the Japanese occupation forces set up the Ika Daigaku medical school, Satrio was appointed to head the anatomy department. During the Indonesian National Revolution, Satrio joined the newly formed Indonesian Red Cross (PMI), where he led the fast response team and commandeered motor vehicles to evacuate wounded soldiers during sporadic fighting in Jakarta whilst also training new medical staff. Due to the situation in Jakarta, Satrio opted to also establish PMI posts outside of Jakarta and evacuated medical supplies and teaching equipment of the former Ika Daigaku to Klaten and Yogyakarta.

Once the Dutch took control of Jakarta, Satrio moved to Karawang, transporting supplies and equipment from Jakarta to the Karawang Hospital. While in Karawang, he was appointed as head doctor of the Banten Division of the Republican forces, with a rank of lieutenant colonel. Throughout his service under the division, he led efforts to vaccinate residents around Banten against smallpox, injecting water buffaloes with smuggled smallpox ampoules in order to create enough vaccines for 240,000 people. He was later appointed deputy chief of Indonesian Army's health service. In the early 1950s, he worked mostly on the Army Central Hospital, though he also lectured anatomy at the University of Indonesia. Since 1957, he became an extraordinary lecturer there, renewing the curriculum and establishing an affiliate program with the University of California.

Satrio was appointed as Junior Minister of Health in the First Working Cabinet on 10 July 1959. During his tenure, the healthcare ethics committee was formed (November 1959), and laws were passed which set the ministry's powers, along with arranging quarantine for ports of entry, disease outbreaks, general hygiene and the pharmaceutical industry. He also established programs to rehabilitate leprosy patients, and attempted to expand a WHO-backed malaria eradication program, which faced significant bureaucratic obstacles and thus budgetary cuts. With Indonesia's growing population, during the Indonesia–Malaysia Confrontation period of the early 1960s, Satrio also launched an "Operation to Eradicate Ignorance in Nutrition" to reduce the impact of nutrition-related diseases. He also visited Western New Guinea in 1963, shortly after the territory's takeover by Indonesia. By 1962, he held the military rank of major general, and was appointed by Abdul Haris Nasution into a "Council of Generals". After the fall of Sukarno, he was replaced by G. A. Siwabessy.

Following his ministerial tenure, Satrio was appointed as the inaugural surgeon general of the Indonesian National Armed Forces. He served in this position between 11 December 1968 to 1 July 1970. Aside from establishing the institution and recruiting the necessary personnel, Satrio worked on medical insurance for service members, and was involved in the family planning program. He also served in the People's Consultative Assembly between 1968 and 1973. He was elected as General Chairman of the Indonesian Red Cross on 28 March 1970. His tenure included activities in then newly annexed East Timor, and humanitarian missions for Vietnamese boat people at Galang Island. He served as chairman until 17 September 1982, when he declined another nomination citing his health.

== Death ==
He died on 5 May 1986 in Bandung, West Java, while giving a speech to officer cadets of the armed forces. The Prof. Dr. Satrio Road, a major street in Jakarta, is named after him.

== Bibliography ==
- Madjiah, Matia (1997). Dokter Gerilya (in Indonesian). Balai Pustaka. ISBN 978-979-407-549-4.
- Madjid, Dien; Lohanda, Mona (1986). Perjuangan dan pengabdian: mosaik kenangan Prof. Dr. Satrio, 1916-1986 (in Indonesian). Arsip Nasional Republik Indonesia.
- Neelakantan, Vivek (23 June 2017). Science, Public Health and Nation-Building in Soekarno-Era Indonesia. Cambridge Scholars Publishing. ISBN 978-1-4438-7849-4.
- Sejarah kesehatan nasional Indonesia: Jilid 2 (in Indonesian). Ministry of Health. 1980.
- Sejarah kesehatan nasional Indonesia: Jilid 3 (in Indonesian). Ministry of Health. 1980.
