= Ipik Gandamana =

Indonesian politician (1906–1979)

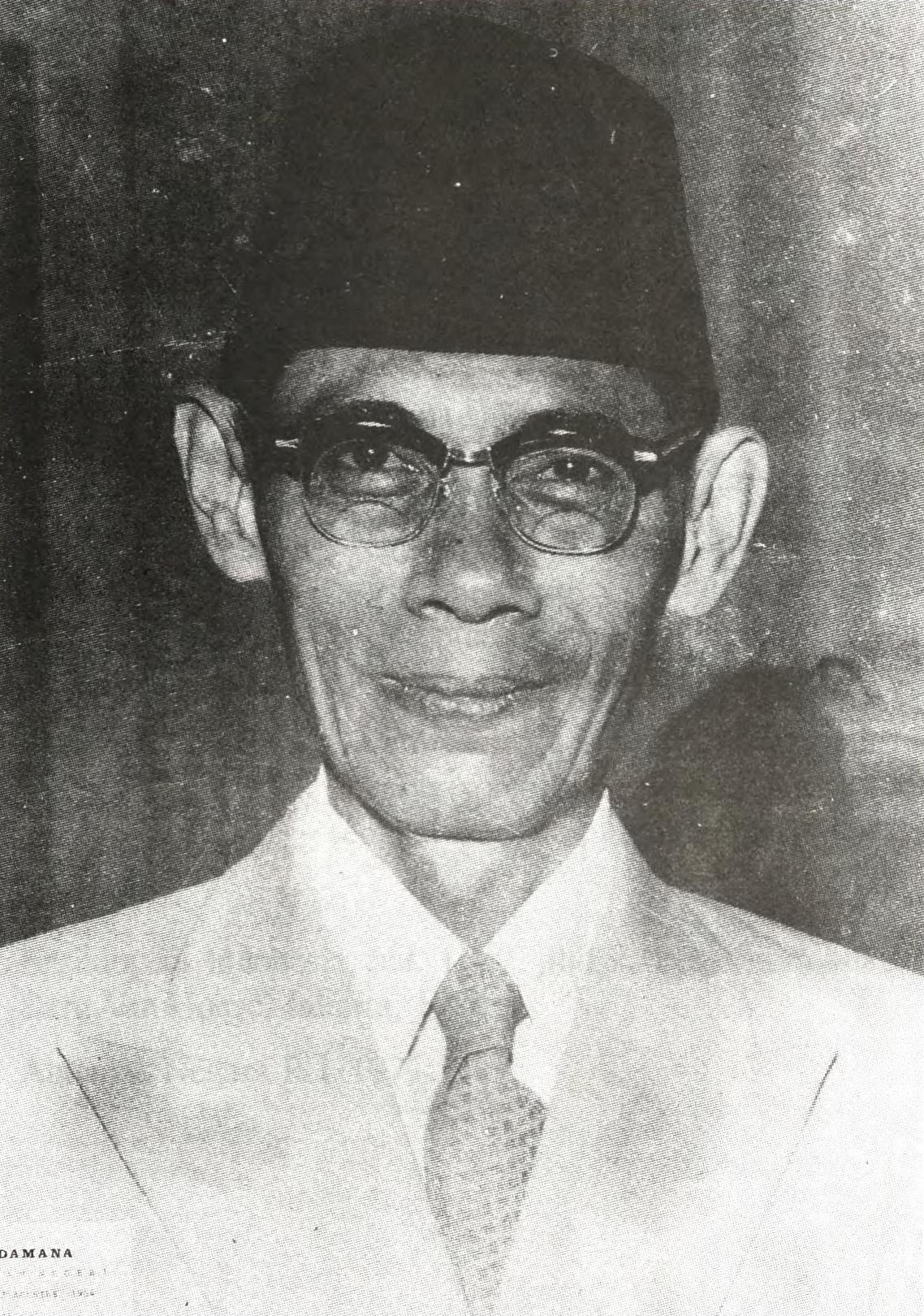
- Gandamana as Minister of Home Affairs

Minister of Home Affairs
- In office 10 July 1959 – 27 August 1964
- President: Sukarno
- Preceded by: Sanusi Hardjadinata
- Succeeded by: Soemarno Sosroatmodjo

Minister of Rural Development
- In office 27 August 1964 – 21 February 1966
- President: Sukarno
- Preceded by: Office established
- Succeeded by: Aminuddin Azis (as Deputy Minister)

Governor of West Java
- In office 1 July 1957 – 1959
- Preceded by: Sanusi Hardjadinata
- Succeeded by: Mashudi

Personal details
- Born: 30 November 1906 Purwakarta, Dutch East Indies
- Died: 1979 (aged 72) Bandung, Indonesia

Ipik Gandamana (30 November 1906 – 1979) was an Indonesian politician and civil servant who served as the Minister of Home Affairs under Sukarno between 1959 and 1964, and as the Governor of West Java between 1957 and 1959. He began his career as a colonial civil servant in 1926, and had also served as regent and later resident in Bogor and Priangan before his governorship.

== Early life and career ==
Gandamana was born in Purwakarta on 30 November 1906. He was educated at the colonial elementary school (Europeesche Lagere School), and studied for one year at a regular colonial middle school (Meer Uitgebreid Lager Onderwijs) before moving to a civil servant preparatory school (Opleiding School Voor Inlandsche Ambtenaren) instead. He had been active within Jong Java. By 1926, he had been accepted as a colonial civil servant, beginning his career as an aide posted in Bogor. Prior to the Japanese invasion, he was reassigned several times to different colonial offices throughout West Java and Jakarta. During the Japanese occupation of the Dutch East Indies, he was appointed to become the camat (district head) of Cibeureum, Tasikmalaya.

== Government career ==
Following the proclamation of Indonesian independence, Gandamana was appointed as assistant regent (wedana) of Ujungberung, Bandung, and then as regent of Bogor. He was arrested by Dutch forces following Operation Product, and was exiled to the rural regions of Bogor Regency where he reestablished the regency's republican government. After the end of the revolution and the handover of sovereignty, he was appointed as the Resident of Bogor, and then reassigned to be Resident of Priangan in 1951. During this period, he became part of an Indonesian study delegation to the United States, staying there for three months after departing in September 1953. After returning to Indonesia, Gandamana published Melawat ke Negara Dollar ("A Visit to the Dollar Country"), a report on his visit. The report compared problems of democracy in Indonesia with those of the United States, and also of the government structure of the United States.

On 1 July 1957, he was appointed to become the Governor of West Java. He encouraged elected local officials favorably over central government bureaucrats. Gandamana viewed the bureaucrats' role as training the less experienced local officials. During his tenure as governor, he also headed a committee which established Padjadjaran University.

Gandamana was appointed as the Minister of Home Affairs within Sukarno's First Working Cabinet on 10 July 1959. As the cabinet was explicitly created to be a non-party cabinet, Gandamana joined several other appointed ministers in resigning from his political party, the League of Supporters of Indonesian Independence. He remained in this post until 27 August 1964, when he was reassigned to become Minister of Rural Development. After Gandamana's tenure as Home Affairs Minister, no other civilian would serve in the post until 2009 when Gamawan Fauzi was appointed to the office.

== Later career ==
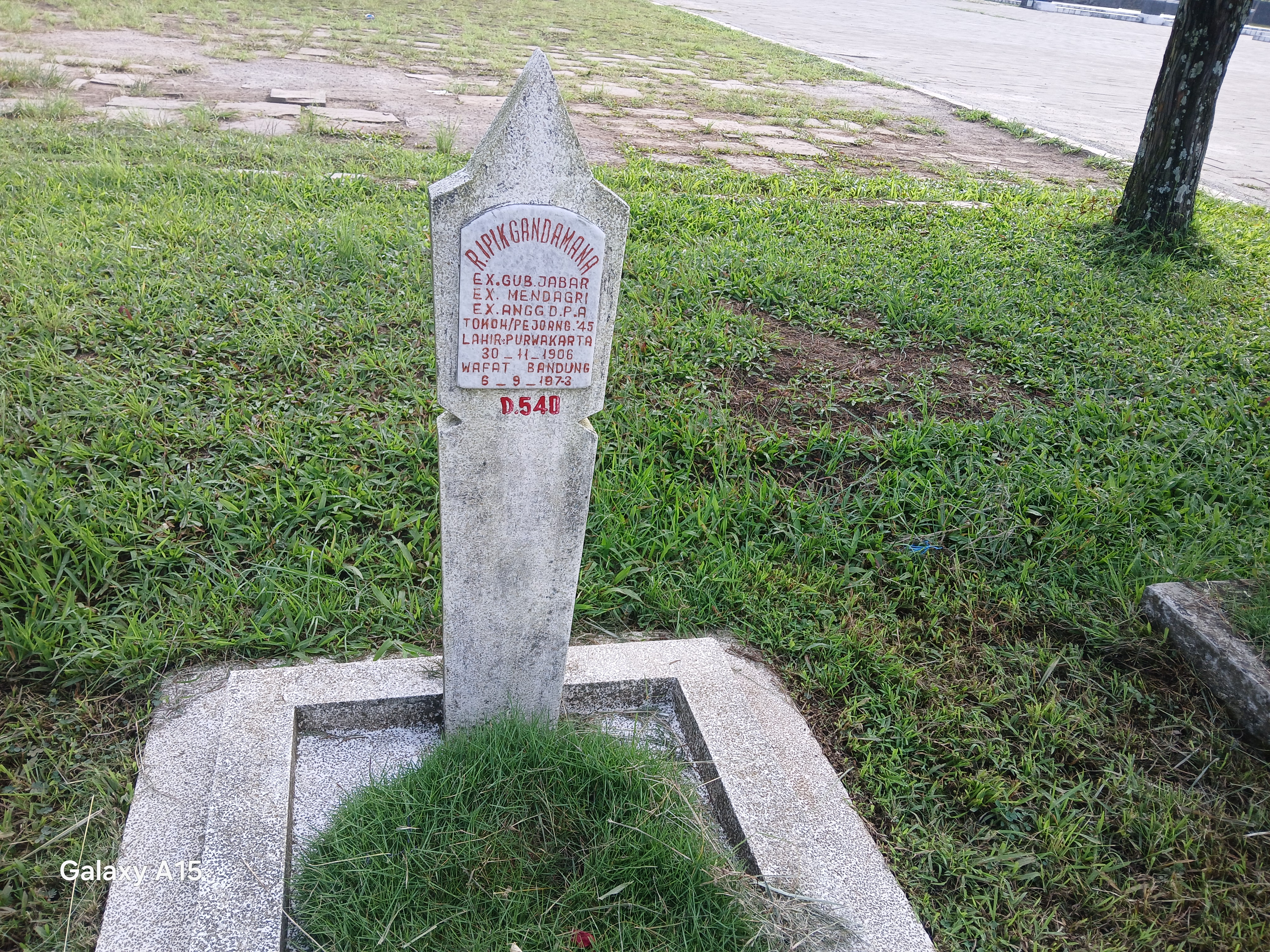
Grave of Ipik Gandamana.

Following the 30 September movement, Sukarno conducted a cabinet reshuffle, and removed Gandamana from his ministerial post on 21 February 1966. Under Suharto, he joined the Supreme Advisory Council between 1968 and 1973.

He died in Bandung on 6 September 1979, and was buried at the Cikutra Heroes' Cemetery in the city. He had a wife and four children. A street in Purwakarta is named after him.
