= Sadjarwo Djarwonagoro =

Indonesian politician and cabinet minister (1996–1917)

Mr. Kanjeng Pangeran Haryo Sadjarwo Djarwonagoro
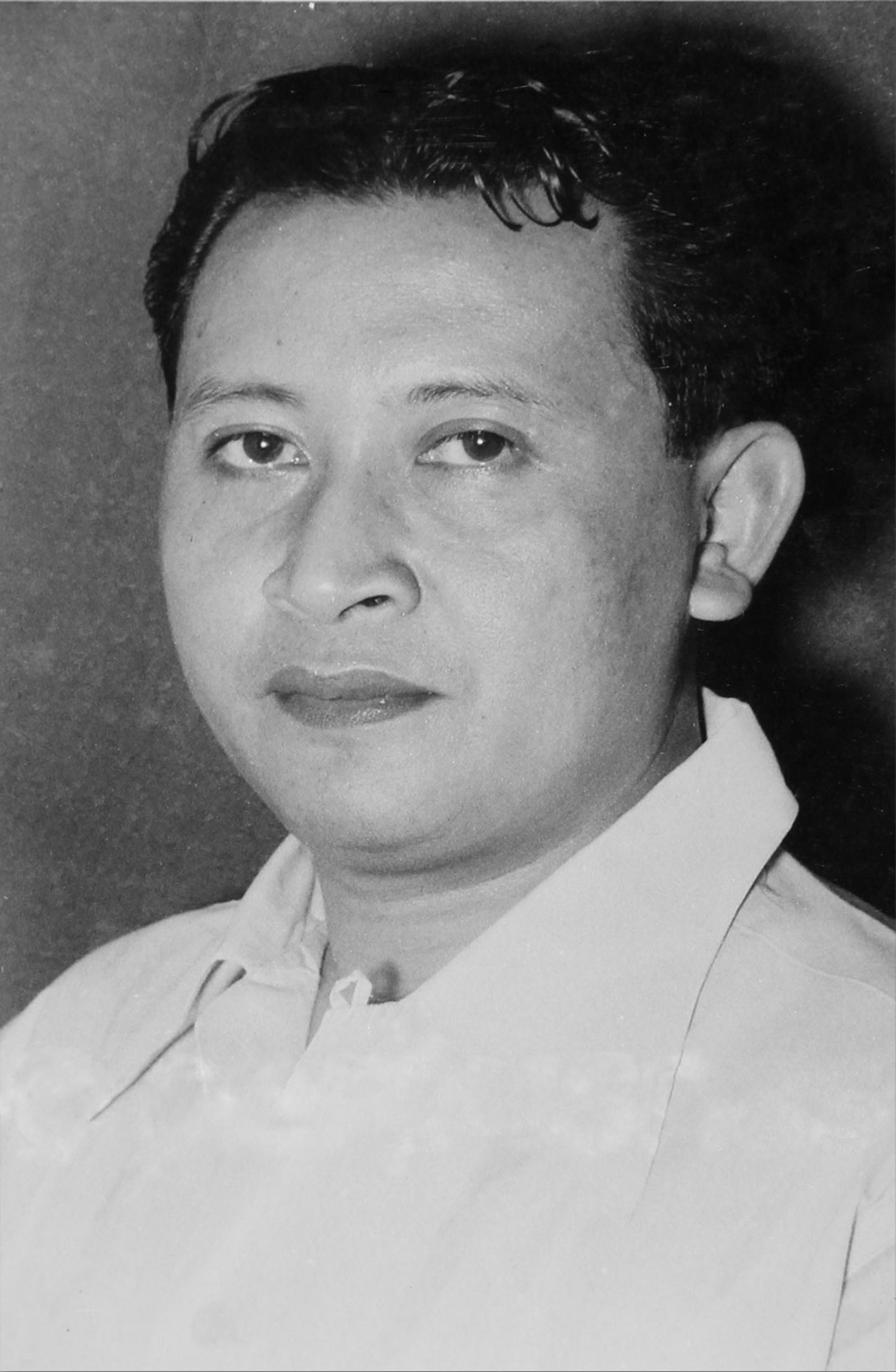
- Official portrait, c. 1954

Personal details
- Born: 3 August 1917 (Note: Older sources, such as Ministry of Information 1954, p. 26, Ministry of Information 1950, p. 19, and Documentation Affairs of the Ministry of Information 1954, p. 66, states that Sadjarwo was born in 1917. However, newer sources such as General Elections Institution 1972, p. 243 and Nayono et al. 1996, p. 106 states that Sadjarwo was born in 1918. There were no differences regarding to the date and month.) Surakarta, Surakarta Sunanate
- Died: 6 May 1996 (aged 78) Jakarta, Indonesia
- Spouse: Endang Soemarti Sadjarwo
- Parent: Djajengwirodjo (father)
Legislative posts
Member of the
People's Representative Council
In office
28 October 1971 – 1 October 1977
Member of the
People's Consultative Assembly
In office
29 February 1967 – 1 October 1971
Ministerial posts
Coordinating Minister of Agriculture
In office 27 August 1964 – 27 March 1966
Preceded by	Office established
Succeeded by	Office abolished
Minister of Agriculture
In office 6 March 1962 – 22 February 1966
Preceded by	Azis Saleh
Succeeded by	Frans Seda
In office 9 April 1957 – 10 July 1959
Preceded by	Eny Karim
Succeeded by	Azis Saleh
In office 30 July 1953 – 12 August 1955
Preceded by	Mohammad Sardjan
Succeeded by	Mohammad Sardjan
In office 21 January 1950 – 6 September 1950
Preceded by	Office established
Succeeded by	Tandiono Manu
Minister of Agrarian Affairs
In office 10 July 1959 – 13 November 1963
Preceded by	Sunarjo
Succeeded by	Rudolf Hermanses

Sadjarwo Djarwonagoro (3 August 1917 – 6 May 1996) was a Javanese politician who served as the Minister of Agriculture, Minister of Agrarian Affairs, and member of the People's Representative Council and People's Consultative Assembly. He was also the rector of the Untag (17 August University) in Jakarta.

Sadjarwo was educated in a Dutch school for indigenous people and continued his studies until high school. He participated in a nationalist organization during this time. After graduating from high school, he worked as an employee in the Ministry of Labor, founded the Peasants Front of Indonesia, and participated in political activities in Madiun. His career began to rise as he was appointed to the Working Body of the Central Indonesian National Committee.

After the recognition of Indonesia, Sadjarwo was appointed as the Minister of Agriculture of Indonesia, representing the Peasants Front of Indonesia. During his time in the ministry, he enacted several policies, including the merger of several academies owned by the Ministry of Agriculture to form the Academy of the Ministry of Agriculture, and the nationalization of Dutch plantations and farms.

He was re-appointed as the Minister of Agrarian Affairs in 1959. He was involved in the creation of the Basic Agrarian Law, which had been proposed since 1948. He proposed the bill to the People's Representative Council, and it was enacted shortly thereafter. After the enactment of the law, he began to implement land reform in Indonesia, but failed due to the prolonged conflicts between various political groups. He was appointed as a member of the People's Consultative Assembly and the People's Representative Council after his appointment as minister was not renewed for the next term. After he resigned from his former position, he became the rector of the Untag (17 August University), a private university in Indonesia.

In 1989, seven years before his death, he was accused of being a communist by Soegiarso Soerojo, a book author, and Ruben Nalenan, a lecturer from Untag. He proved his innocence of these accusations.

== Early life ==
Sadjarwo Djarwonagoro was born on 3 August 1917 in Surakarta. He began his education at the Hollandsch-Inlandsche School (Dutch school for indigenous people), graduating from the school in 1934. He continued his studies at the Meer Uitgebreid Lager Onderwijs (equivalent to junior high school) and graduated in 1937. He went to the Algemene Middelbare School (equivalent to high school) and graduated in 1940.

During this time, he joined the Young Indonesia organization and the Indonesian Students' Union.

== Early activism ==
After graduation, Sadjarwo worked as a teacher in the Taman Siswa school. He resigned in 1941 and later worked as the Head of the Land Taxation Office in Kediri in 1943. He was transferred to Madiun to work in the same position there in 1946. He was transferred again and worked as the Head of the Taxation Office in Solo until mid-1947.

During this time, Sadjarwo became one of the founding members of the Peasants Front of Indonesia and served as the organization's vice chairman. He also participated in politics as a member of the Regional Indonesian National Committee of Madiun and as the Deputy Chairman of the Madiun Executive Body.

After he resigned from the taxation office, Sadjarwo became a high-ranking civil employee in the Ministry of Labor. He was appointed in 1947 as a member of the Working Body of the Central Indonesian National Committee, representing the Peasants Front of Indonesia. He was seated in the Internal Affairs and Welfare Section.

== Minister of Agriculture ==
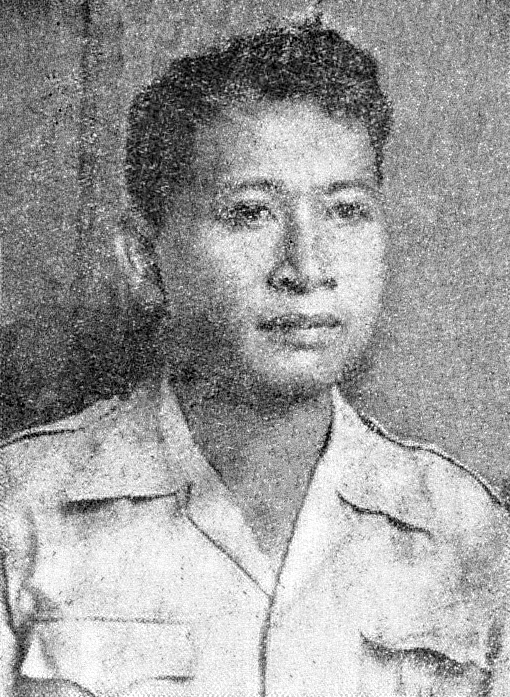
Sadjarwo as the Minister of Agriculture in the Halim Cabinet

Sadjarwo was appointed as Minister of Agriculture of the Republic of Indonesia, a state under the United States of Indonesia, in the Halim Cabinet. After the dissolution of the federal state, he was appointed to the same position in the First Ali Sastroamidjojo Cabinet, Djuanda Cabinet, Fourth Working Cabinet, and the Dwikora Cabinet, which spanned from 1950 until 1959.

=== Programs and works (1950–1957) ===
During his tenure as the Minister of Agriculture, Sadjarwo actively participated in international conferences regarding agricultural affairs. He attended the 1950, 1952, 1953, and 1957 Rubber Study Group Conference as the leader of the Indonesian delegates.

In 1952, when he was not re-appointed as Minister of Agriculture, he was appointed by the Minister of Agriculture at that time, Mohammad Sardjan, as a member of a committee to research and implement Food and Agriculture Organization decisions regarding the agricultural problems in Indonesia.

As the Minister of Agriculture, Sadjarwo targeted the year 1954 as the beginning of Indonesia's self-sufficiency in rice production. He stated that rice imports only serve to build inventory and stabilize domestic prices. He highlighted this plan during a visit to Kalimantan, where he also recommended that a fishery cooperative should be established, fishing ships should be motorized, and timber quality in Kalimantan should be improved.

=== State Minister for Transmigration Affairs ===
During the formation of the Second Ali Sastroamidjojo Cabinet, there were calls from President Sukarno and the Central All-Indonesian Workers Organization to place a leftist minister in the cabinet, to take the position of the State Minister for Transmigration Affairs. Even though Sadjarwo was nominally independent, he was the vice chairman of the BTI, which influenced Sukarno to nominate him as a possible leftist minister. This nomination caused the media to label Sadjarwo as a cryptocommunist.

Sadjarwo's nomination was strongly opposed by the Masyumi Party, which threatened to withhold its support to the cabinet. The threat caused Sadjarwo's rejection as a minister in the Second Ali Sastroamidjojo Cabinet.

=== Opening of the Academy of the Ministry of Agriculture ===
During his term as the Minister of Agriculture in the Djuanda Cabinet, Sadjarwo officially opened the Academy of the Ministry of Agriculture. The academy was located in Ciawi and was the result of the merger of the Biology Academy, Agricultural Research Academy Course, and the Marine Biology Fisheries Course. Sadjarwo stated that the academy was intended to fill the shortage of skilled employees at the Ministry of Agriculture.

=== Nationalization of Dutch plantations and farms ===
By the end of 1957, Dutch-Indonesian relations began to deteriorate due to the conflicts regarding Netherlands New Guinea. During this time, Sadjarwo issued a decree to temporarily confiscate 248 Dutch plantations and farm companies in Indonesia. He stated that the confiscation would end if the Dutch recognized Indonesia's authority over the Netherlands New Guinea. As the Dutch never fulfilled this demand, on 13 February 1959, Sadjarwo announced that the government had permanently confiscated all 248 Dutch companies in Indonesia and would later determine which companies would be nationalized.

=== Joining the Indonesian National Party ===
As the Peasants Front of Indonesia became closely affiliated with the Communist Party of Indonesia, Sadjarwo left the Peasants Front in 1956 and became a member of the Indonesian National Party in 1957/1958. (Note: Rocamora 1970, p. 151 states that Sadjarwo entered the Indonesian National Party in 1957, while Lev 2009, p. 165 states that Sadjarwo entered the Indonesian National Party by mid-1958.) Sadjarwo was appointed as the second vice chairman of the Indonesian National Farmers' Association, the farming organization of the Indonesian National Party.

Even though Sadjarwo left the Peasants Front of Indonesia in 1956, official reports still stated his affiliation to the organization in the Djuanda Cabinet, which was formed in 1957.

== Minister of Agrarian Affairs (1959–1963) ==
Sadjarwo was appointed Minister of Agrarian Affairs on 10 July 1959, in the First Working Cabinet. He would continually hold the position until 13 November 1963.

=== Basic Agrarian Law ===
Sadjarwo's involvement in the Basic Agrarian Law began before he was appointed a minister. Since 1948, he has been involved in the Yogyakarta Agrarian Committee as a member. This committee was created to establish agrarian law in Indonesia but failed to fulfill its task. In 1951, Sadjarwo was appointed as the vice chairman of a new committee, the Jakarta Agrarian Committee, headed by Sarimin Reksodihardjo. The committee, having not fulfilled its mission, was dissolved several years later.

The next committee, the Soewahjo Committee, formed on 14 January 1956, managed to create a draft of the Basic Agrarian Law in 1957. The draft was submitted to the People's Representative Council on 24 April 1958 by the Minister of Agrarian Affairs at that time, Soenarjo. The draft was rejected by the council due to "political affairs", and President Sukarno advised that the Ministry should revise the draft with recommendations from experts. The revision for the draft was completed during Sadjarwo's term, and on 1 August 1960, the draft was submitted again to the council by Sadjarwo. Less than two months later, on 24 September 1960, the council approved the draft, which was enacted as Law No. 5 of 1960, the Basic Law for Agrarian Affairs. The date of enactment of the law is celebrated today in Indonesia as National Agrarian Day and National Farmers' Day.

=== Land reform ===
In his accountability speech in the People's Representative Council regarding the Basic Agrarian Law, Sadjarwo stated that the concept of land reform would be implemented as soon as possible, after the enactment of the Basic Agrarian Law. He pointed out that land reform would evenly distribute lands to the people; avoid speculations and extortion; reinforce the people's rights to land ownership; end the system of landlords and abolish the ownership and control of land on a large scale; increase national farm production; and push for an intensive farming with cooperation.

Sadjarwo's Ministry of Agrarian Affairs was so committed to working on land reform that by 1962, the ministry had produced thirteen different land products relating to law reforms. These new guidelines had a major impact on land reform. For example, in Klaten, Central Java, as noted by Soegijanto Padmo, a researcher on agrarian affairs, the regent of Klaten had already established a land reform committee and had enacted several decisions regarding land reform at the village level.

Although this program went well in several areas, Idham Chalid, the leader of Nahdlatul Ulama, stated that it caused conflicts between groups in the villages; even waqf lands also became a source of conflict. Chalid advised the government to investigate this problem. The leader of the Communist Party of Indonesia, D. N. Aidit, stated that the land reform in Java, Madura, and Bali must be done by the year 1963, and if not, the landlords must be arrested. These continued conflicts eventually thwarted land reform efforts, and the issue was not raised by the New Order government until recently.

== During the New Order ==
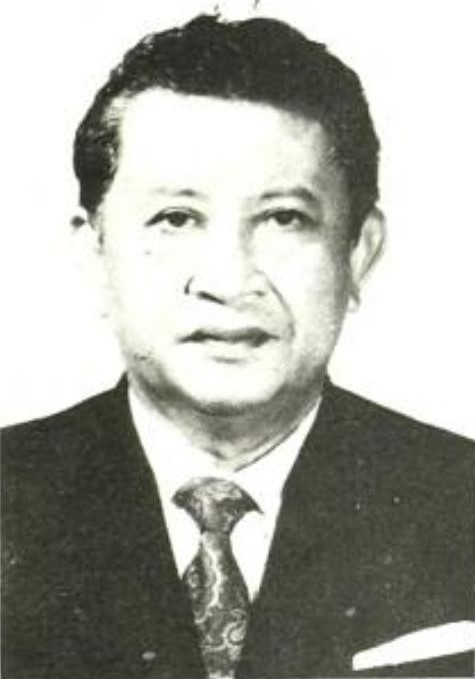
Sadjarwo in 1971.

After the New Order, a large-scale arrest was launched against members of Communist Party of Indonesia-affiliated organizations, including the Peasants Front of Indonesia. As Sadjarwo had left the organization many years before, he was safe from being branded a communist collaborator, but student demonstrators demanded his resignation as minister.

Sadjarwo resigned from his position in 1966, but two years later, he was elected as the member of the Working Body of the People's Consultative Assembly on 29 February 1968 from the Indonesian National Party, replacing Hardi. Several years later, in the 1971 Indonesian legislative election, he was elected as a member of the People's Representative Council from Banyumas, representing the Indonesian National Party fraction.

Sadjarwo's official resume for the People's Representative Council does not include his connections to the Peasants Front of Indonesia.

== Later life ==
After the 1971 People's Representative Council officially ended on 1 October 1977, Sadjarwo became the rector of the Untag (17 August 1945 University) beginning in 1986. He also was active in the 1945 Generation organization, which was a group of politicians and military figures that had participated in the Indonesian National Revolution. He served as head of social affairs, transmigration, and law for the organization between 1988 and 1993.

=== Accusations of being a communist ===
During his time as the rector of the Untag, Sadjarwo was accused of being a communist by Soegiarso Soerojo, the author of the book Siapa Menabur Angin Akan Menuai Badai ("Those Who Sow the Wind Will Reap the Storm"). He was identified as the former leader of the Peasants Front of Indonesia. Ruben Nalenan, a lecturer from Untag, also pointed out several books that alleged Sadjarwo was formerly endorsed by the Communist Party of Indonesia as a minister during the first Ali Sastroamidjojo Cabinet. Nalenan reported this case to the Kopertis (coordinating institution for private universities), the Minister of Education and Culture, and also the Director General of Higher Education. This report was leaked to the press and was first published by the Jayakarta newspaper, owned by the military.

Sadjarwo refuted the accusations, and pointed out that during his time with the Peasants Front of Indonesia, the organization was not affiliated with any party. He had left the Peasants Front of Indonesia, he claimed, after he felt that the organization was becoming more and more leftist. He also pointed out that, in 1964, he condemned the actions of the Communist Party of Indonesia and in return, the Communist Party of Indonesia demanded that he be removed from his position as minister.

Even though Soerojo admitted his mistakes and revised the book in the third edition, Nalenan refused to admit the fact that Sadjarwo was not a communist. Nalenan stated that the Peasants Front of Indonesia was involved in the Madiun Affair, and in September 1953, the organization officially merged with the Indonesian Peasants' Union. Due to this ongoing accusation by Nalenan, Sadjarwo, along with one of his children, announced plans to sue Nalenan in court.

The military intervened, and on 1 February 1988, Sadjarwo was summoned by the regional military office, the Military District Commando 501 located in Central Jakarta. Three days later, the Staff Intelligence Officer of the district commando, Captain Basiroen S., went to Sadjarwo's university, the Untag. Basiroen stated that "There was no unrest in the university and the lectures went as usual. The problem is solved, Sadjarwo has clarified in the newspaper and everything is clear".

== Personal life ==
Sadjarwo was married to Nyi Endang Soemarti, a poet and a dancer. The couple had seven children. One of them, Isyana Sadjarwo, became the temporary deputy speaker of the People's Representative Council in 1982.

On 6 May 1996, Sadjarwo died in Jakarta. He was buried in the Wijaya Brata Garden, a garden cemetery for former teachers of Taman Siswa, located in Yogyakarta.
