= Abdul Azis Saleh =

Indonesian anthropologist and scouting leader

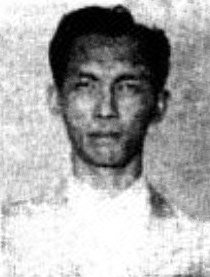
- Abdul Azis Saleh in 1957

Minister of Industry
- In office 6 March 1962 – 28 March 1966
- Preceded by: Chaerul Saleh
- Succeeded by: Mohammad Jusuf

Minister of Agriculture
- In office 10 July 1959 – 6 March 1962
- Preceded by: Sadjarwo Djarwonagoro
- Succeeded by: Sadjarwo Djarwonagoro

Minister of Health
- In office 9 April 1957 – 5 July 1959
- Preceded by: Hadrianus Sinaga
- Succeeded by: Satrio

Personal details
- Born: 20 September 1914
- Died: 3 April 2001 (aged 86)
- Occupation: Specialist in anthropology and education
- Known for: Leader of Indonesian Scouting

Dr. Abdul Azis Saleh (20 September 1914 – 3 April 2001), a specialist in anthropology and education, was a leader of Indonesian Scouting and served as a member of the World Scout Committee and President of the World Organization of the Scout Movement Asia-Pacific Region.

He became involved in the creation of the Gerakan Pramuka Indonesia in 1961 and was a member of the "Group of 5" mandated by President Sukarno, who took the opportunity of the absence of the Minister of Education to build a non-communist youth association. In 1970, he became Gerakan Pramuka Secretary General.

In 1978, he was awarded the 129th Bronze Wolf, the only distinction of the WOSM, awarded by the World Scout Committee for exceptional services to world Scouting.

He was also successively Minister of Health (1957–1959), Minister of Agriculture and then Minister of Industry in Indonesia.
