= Ruslan Abdulgani =

Indonesian politician and diplomat (1914–2005)

General (Tit.) Ruslan Abdulgani
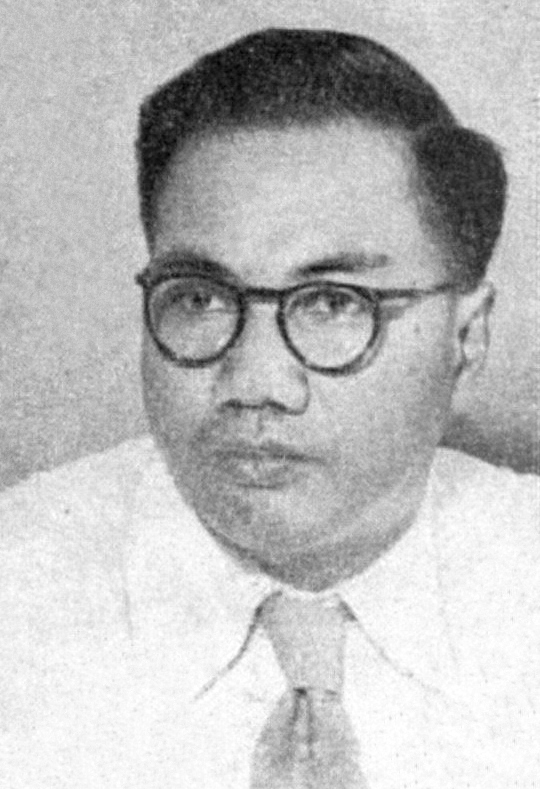
- Official portrait, c. 1954

15th Minister for Information
- In office 13 November 1963 – 27 August 1964
- Preceded by: Mohammad Yamin
- Succeeded by: Achmadi

9th Minister of Foreign Affairs
- In office 24 March 1956 – 9 April 1957
- Preceded by: Ide Anak Agung Gde Agung
- Succeeded by: Subandrio

1st Rector of the Teacher and Education Science Institute
- In office 2 May 1964 – 12 June 1966
- Preceded by: Office established
- Succeeded by: Achmad Sanusi

Personal details
- Born: 24 November 1914 Surabaya, Dutch East Indies
- Died: 29 June 2005 (aged 90) Jakarta, Indonesia
- Occupation: Politician; diplomat

Military service
- Allegiance: Indonesia
- Branch/service: Indonesian Army
- Years of service: 1945–1949
- Rank: General (titular)
- Battles/wars: Indonesian National Revolution

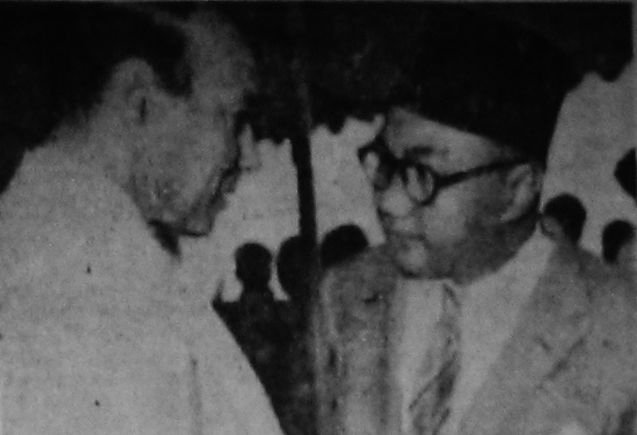
Abdulgani (right) in 1956

Ruslan Abdulgani (his first name is also spelled Roeslan; 24 November 1914 – 29 June 2005) was an Indonesian government official and diplomat known for his role as a leader during the Indonesian National Revolution in the late 1940s, and as a key minister and United Nations ambassador in the Sukarno government during the 1950s and 1960s.

== Early life ==
Roeslan was born and raised in Surabaya, East Java. He came from an upper-middle-class family; his father was a neighborhood shopkeeper and owned a small fleet of taxis. His mother, his father's second wife, was a religious tutor, giving reading and religion lessons from the Qur'an. According to a memoir of his childhood, which Roeslan wrote in the 1970s, his mother was also a strong Javanese nationalist, and it was from her that he first learned about Dutch colonial rule and the possibility of independence.

During the Indonesian fight for independence from the Dutch in the late 1940s, Roeslan was a key lieutenant under Sukarno, earning the future president's trust and ensuring him a secure place in the new government. In the 1950s he served most prominently as foreign minister, representing Indonesia abroad during the tumultuous decade when, under Sukarno's leadership, Indonesia tried to transform itself into a postcolonial, anti-imperialist success story.

== Politics ==
Roeslan's most prominent moment as a public servant came in 1955, when he served as secretary-general of the Bandung Conference, a major meeting of African and Asian countries working to form what became the Non-Aligned Movement as an alternative to alignment with one of the Cold War superpowers. Roeslan served as Indonesia's foreign minister from March 1956 to April 1957. From July 1959 to March 1962, he was head of the Supreme Advisory Council (DPA); in October 1962 he became Minister of Information.

While being foreign minister, Roeslan was briefly arrested in August 1956 by the Indonesian military in West Java, and accused of corruption. Part of a power struggle between the Sukarno government and dissatisfied military officers, he was promptly pardoned by vote of Sukarno's cabinet, and the military was forced to release him.

While being a minister in 1964, he was a first rector of Teacher and Education Science Institute or now is Indonesia University of Education. He acted as rector until 1966.

After Suharto replaced Sukarno as president in 1967, Roeslan served briefly as Indonesian ambassador to the United Nations. He left formal government service in 1971, but continued to play a role as an elder statesman in Indonesian politics. After president Suharto stepped down in 1998, he emerged as an advisor to presidential candidate Megawati Sukarnoputri, Sukarno's daughter, and as a critic of Suharto's Golkar successors, Jusuf Habibie and Abdurrahman Wahid.

In 1998, Dutch historians Bob de Graaff and Cees Wiebes published a book, Villa Maarheeze: De Geschiedenis van de Inlichtingendienst Buitenland (Villa Maarheeze: The History of the Netherlands Foreign Intelligence Service) in which they alleged that Roeslan had secretly worked for the Dutch government during the conflict over Papua (Irian Jaya) in the 1960s, by passing confidential information about Indonesian activities. Roeslan vehemently denied the charges, saying that he had seldom even communicated with the Dutch government, even in his official government capacities.

== Family ==
Roeslan's wife Sihwati Nawangwulan, also a prominent activist during Indonesia's independence movement, died in 2001 at the age of 85. Roeslan and Sihwati had five children together. Roeslan died in June 2005 after suffering from stroke and pneumonia. He was one of the last survivors of Indonesia's war for independence.

President Susilo Bambang Yudhoyono called him "a leader who never said bad things about others". Suharto called him "a great man and leader who has given so much for the country he loves".

His second daughter, Retnowati Abdulgani-Knapp, wrote a biography about her father, A Fading Dream: The Story of Roeslan Abdulgani and Indonesia, which was published in 2003. In it, she described Roeslan as a lifelong fighter against colonialism and imperialism.

== Honours ==
- Austria: Grand Decoratiom of Honour in Gold with Sash (Grosses Goldenes Ehrenzeichen am Bande) of the Decoration of Honour for Services to the Republic of Austria (1956).
