= Prijono =

Indonesian politician, academic (1907–1969)

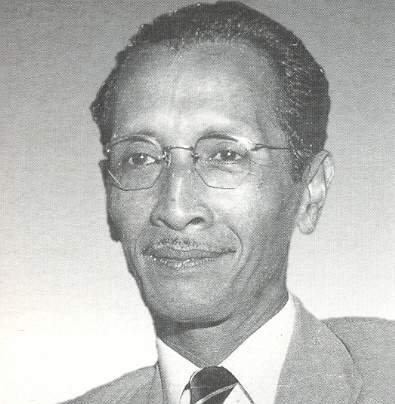
Prijono

Prijono (20 July 1907 – 6 March 1969) was an Indonesian politician and academic. Prijono was a leading figure of the Murba Party and the Indonesian Peace Committee. Prijono served as Minister of Education and Culture between 1957 and 1966. He was one of the intellectual ideologues who surrounded President Sukarno.

In December 1954 he was awarded the Stalin Peace Prize.

== Academic ==
Prijono studied in Paris and obtained a Ph.D. at the Leiden University (studying medieval Javanese texts).

In 1954 Prijono presented a proposal for a new orthography for Indonesian. Prijono suggested that letter combinations such as 'nj' and 'ng' be substituted with IPA characters. A similar orthography, 'Ejaan Kongres', was in use in Malaya. The Indonesian government appointed Prijono as chairman of a spelling commission. In 1960 Prijono's orthography was the basis of the MELINDO proposal for a joint Melayu-Indonesian orthography. The Malaysian and Indonesian government agreed to implement the MELINDO orthography, but the project fell into oblivion as relations between the two countries became increasingly hostile.

== Minister ==
Prijono was appointed as Minister of Basic Education and Culture in the Djuanda Cabinet formed in 1957. His appointment was met with opposition from anti-Communist sectors, who claimed that he was linked to the Communist Party of Indonesia. Prijono continued to serve as a minister in all cabinets until the end of the Sukarno period. As a government minister, Prijono was frequently targeted by the army and Islamic organizations.

In October 1960 Prijono introduced the principle of Pancawardhana ('five principles of development') in the primary and secondary education system. This was followed by Prijono's linking of Pancawardhana to the principle of Pancacita ('five loves') in February 1963. The secular Pancacita principle was developed by National Education Institute, an institution dominated by the Communist Party. However, Prijono's policies met with opposition from General Nasution. From 1961 Prijono would share the Ministry of Education with Sjarif Thajeb (a high-ranking officer with links to Islamic organizations, Minister of Higher Education and Science). Prijono was pro-Soviet whilst Sjarif Thajeb was pro-American. And whilst Prijono promoted secularism in the primary and secondary education system, Sjarif Thajeb introduced compulsory classes on religion in the universities. Thus the wider political confrontation between the army and the Communist Party was reproduced within the walls of the Ministry of Education.

During his government tenure, Prijono established various cultural institutions with the objective to promote new national and revolutionary culture. These institutions taught new worker-peasant folk dances and revolutionary songs.

On March 16, 1966 Prijono was kidnapped by activists of the Islamic students movement KAPPI and Laskar militia. He was brought to the headquarters of KOSTRAD.

== Honour ==
=== Foreign honour ===
- Malaya :
  - Honorary Commander of the Order of the Defender of the Realm (PMN (K)) - Tan Sri (1959)
