= Soeharto Sastrosoeyoso =

Indonesian doctor (1908–2000)

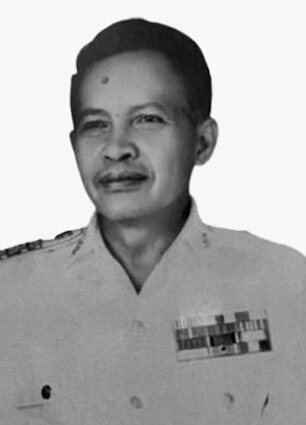
- Born: Raden Soeharto Sastrosoeyoso; 24 December 1908; Surakarta, Dutch East Indies
- Died: 30 November 2000 (aged 91); Jakarta, Indonesia
- Occupation: Physician
- Spouses: Titi Paraati (m. 1933; div. 1962) Sinta Tedjasukmana (m. 1962; died 1993)
- Children: 3
- Relatives: Mimi Mariani (daughter-in-law)

Raden Soeharto Sastrosoeyoso (24 December 1908 – 30 November 2000) was an Indonesian doctor and a National hero of Indonesia. He was the founder of Indonesian Doctors Association and Bank Negara Indonesia.

== Life ==
Sastrosoeyoso in July 1959

Sastrosoeyoso was born on 24 December 1908 in Tegalgondo, a village in Surakarta, Central Java, to R. Sastrosoeyoso and Hermina. He starred his education by went into Europe Lasgere School, and later graduated from Meer Uitgebreid Lager Onderwijs school in Malang. Sastrosoeyoso then attended Algemeene Middelbare School in Yogyakarta, and later continued his higher study on Fakultas Medica Bataviensis at Geneeskundige Hoogeschool te Batavia in Batavia, where he earned his medical degree on 25 May 1935, and received Medicina Doctoren title on 14 April 1937.

After completed his study, he started his practice as a clinician in Kramat, Senen, Central Jakarta. He met President Sukarno in July 1942 during a delivery for her stepdaughter with Inggit Garnasih, Ratna Djuwita Asmara Hadi, where he later became a private doctor for him since the end of 1942. Sastrosoeyoso also had a close relationship with Sukarno where he often called him Mas Karno, and also went to became a private doctor for Indonesia first Vice President Mohammad Hatta, also in the end of 1942. In late 1942, it was Sukarno's turn to become his direct patient. At that time, he complained of pain in his lower back and abdomen. Sukarno admitted that he had been experiencing the pain since he was a student at the Bandung Institute of Technology, but that it had recently been compounded by the appearance of blood in his urine. According to physician NM Sher, a non-surgical hemorrhoid specialist practicing in Senen, the car Sukarno rode in after officially becoming president in August 1945 was a gift from Sastrosoeyoso. He began to wrote his experience as the private doctor of the two proclaimers and later published it into his autobiography, Saksi Sejarah, in 1982. After the Proclamation of Indonesian Independence, Sastrosoeyoso helped in managing finances of the newly established republic and to arrange various expenses to run the government, where he donated his sedan car to Sukarno in order to help run the government. When the Dwitunggal Sukarno and Hatta, along with other leaders, had to move to Yogyakarta, Sastrosoeyoso went with them. His house was then taken over by Netherlands Indies Civil Administration troops. Upon his return from Yogyakarta after the Roem–Van Roijen Agreement in 1949, he occupied a modest house at Eijkman street Number 8, now Kimia street.

In 1950, Sastrosoeyoso was one of the founder of Indonesian Doctors Association, where he arranged a meeting at his house with all of the Indonesian doctors, who then agreed to propose the establishment of Indonesian Doctors Association. Later, he was appointed to became the Minister of People's Industry from 1959 until 1962. After his term ended, Sastrosoeyoso was appointed again to serve as a minister for three times, such as: Minister of Trade, Minister of Issuance of Banks and Private Capital, and Coordinating Minister of National Development Planning Affairs.

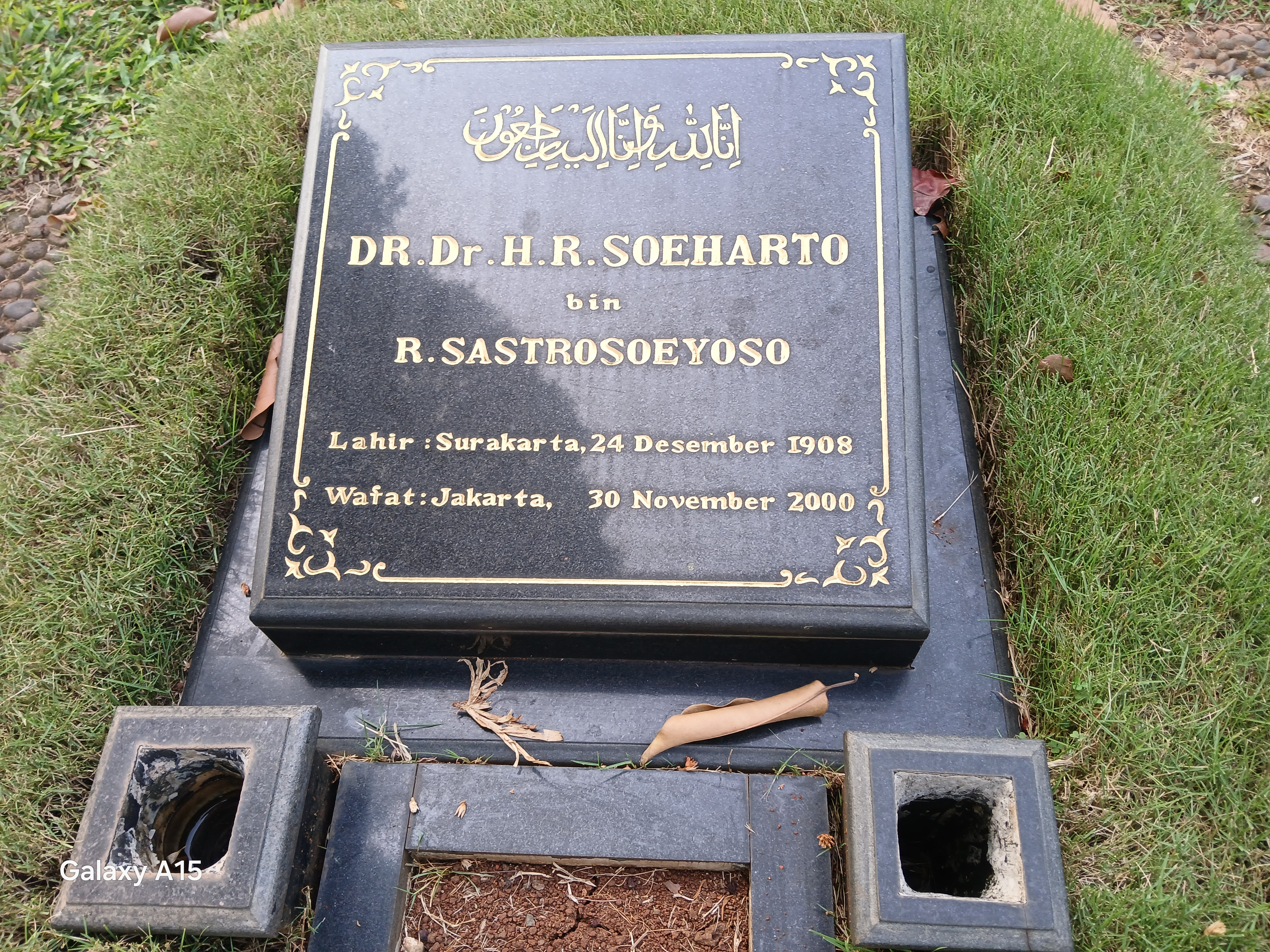
Sastrosoeyoso grave at Tanah Kusir Cemetery in Kebayoran Lama, South Jakarta

Sastrosoeyoso also founded the Bank Negara Indonesia, and contributed in the development of Sarinah Thamrin Jakarta area and in Hotel Indonesia construction project. He was also the pioneer of the family planning program in Indonesia, where he later founded Indonesian Family Planning Association. Sastrosoeyoso died in Jakarta, Indonesia, on 30 November 2000 at the age of 91.

== Family ==
Sastrosoeyoso was married to Titi Paraati on 13 October 1933, and has had three children: Semiarto (1933–1999), Pratiwi Soeharto Hoetomo (born 1939) and Paraati Soeharto (died 2010). They divorced on 26 May 1962. His only son, Semiarto, was married to actress Mimi Mariani and has had three children with her.

Sastrosoeyoso second marriage was to Sinta Tedjasukmana on 29 December 1962, and remained together until her death on 24 August 1993. They had six children: Dewi Arimbi, Dewi Kamaratih, Dewi Prabarini, Dewi Surijawati, Dewi Kurnia Lestari and Bambang Radityo Nugroho Soeharto.

== Legacy ==
On 7 November 2022, President Joko Widodo awarded the title of National hero of Indonesia to Sastrosoeyoso, along with four other figures: Paku Alam VIII, Rubini Natawisastra, Salahuddin bin Talibuddin, and Ahmad Sanusi.

== Works cited ==
- Wibawana, Widhia Arum (3 November 2022). "Profil dr Soeharto, Dokter Pribadi Sukarno yang Jadi Pahlawan Nasional 2022". detiknews (in Indonesian).
- Andryanto, S. Dian (5 November 2022). "dr Soeharto, Dokter Pribadi Bung Karno dan Bung Hatta Dianugerahi Gelar Pahlawan Nasional". Tempo.
- Tamtomo, Ibnu Dwi (10 November 2022). "Biodata Dr. dr. H. R. Soeharto, Pahlawan Nasional Asli Klaten, Dokter Pribadi Keluarga Soekarno - Halaman 2 - Tribunsolo.com". solo.tribunnews.com.
- el (3 May 1971). "Bintang Film Mimi Mariani Meninggal Dunia Karena Penyakit Kanker". KOMPAS (in Indonesian). p. 3.
