= Chairul Saleh =

Indonesian politician

General (Honorary) Chairul Saleh
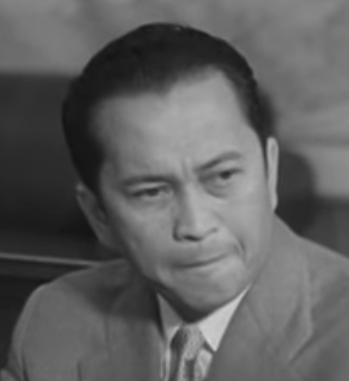
- Chairul Saleh in Moscow (May 1959)

1st Speaker of the People's Consultative Assembly
- In office 1960–1966
- President: Sukarno
- Preceded by: Office established
- Succeeded by: Wiluyo Puspoyudo

6th Minister of Industry
- In office 28 February 1960 – 27 August 1964
- President: Sukarno
- Preceded by: Suharto
- Succeeded by: Hadi Thayeb

1st Minister for Energy and Mineral Resources
- In office 10 July 1959 – 27 August 1964
- President: Sukarno
- Preceded by: N/A
- Succeeded by: Armunanto

Personal details
- Born: 13 September 1916 Sawahlunto, Sumatera Barat, Dutch East Indies
- Died: 8 February 1967 (aged 50) Jakarta, Indonesia
- Resting place: Karet Bivak Cemetery
- Party: Murba Party
- Spouse: Yohana Siti Menara Saidah
- Children: Maidaniah; Hafidz; Raisis; Ahwahni

Military service
- Allegiance: Indonesia
- Branch/service: Indonesian Army
- Years of service: 1945–1967
- Rank: General (Titular)
- Battles/wars: Indonesian War of Independence

Chaerul Saleh gelar Datuk Paduko Rajo (13 September 1916 – 8 February 1967) was an Indonesian politician who served as deputy prime minister during the Sukarno presidency. He was a close confidant of Sukarno, whom he had helped persuade to declare Indonesian independence in 1945. He lived in the Netherlands from 1952 to 1953, but returned to Indonesia after being expelled. He joined Sukarno's circle of advisers in 1955.

One week before the abortive coup on 30 September 1965, Saleh went to China with a delegation of 45 to celebrate China's national day on 1 October. He is buried in Karet Bivak Cemetery, Central Jakarta.
