= Sutomo =

Indonesian military leader (1920–1981)

- 'Bung Tomo'
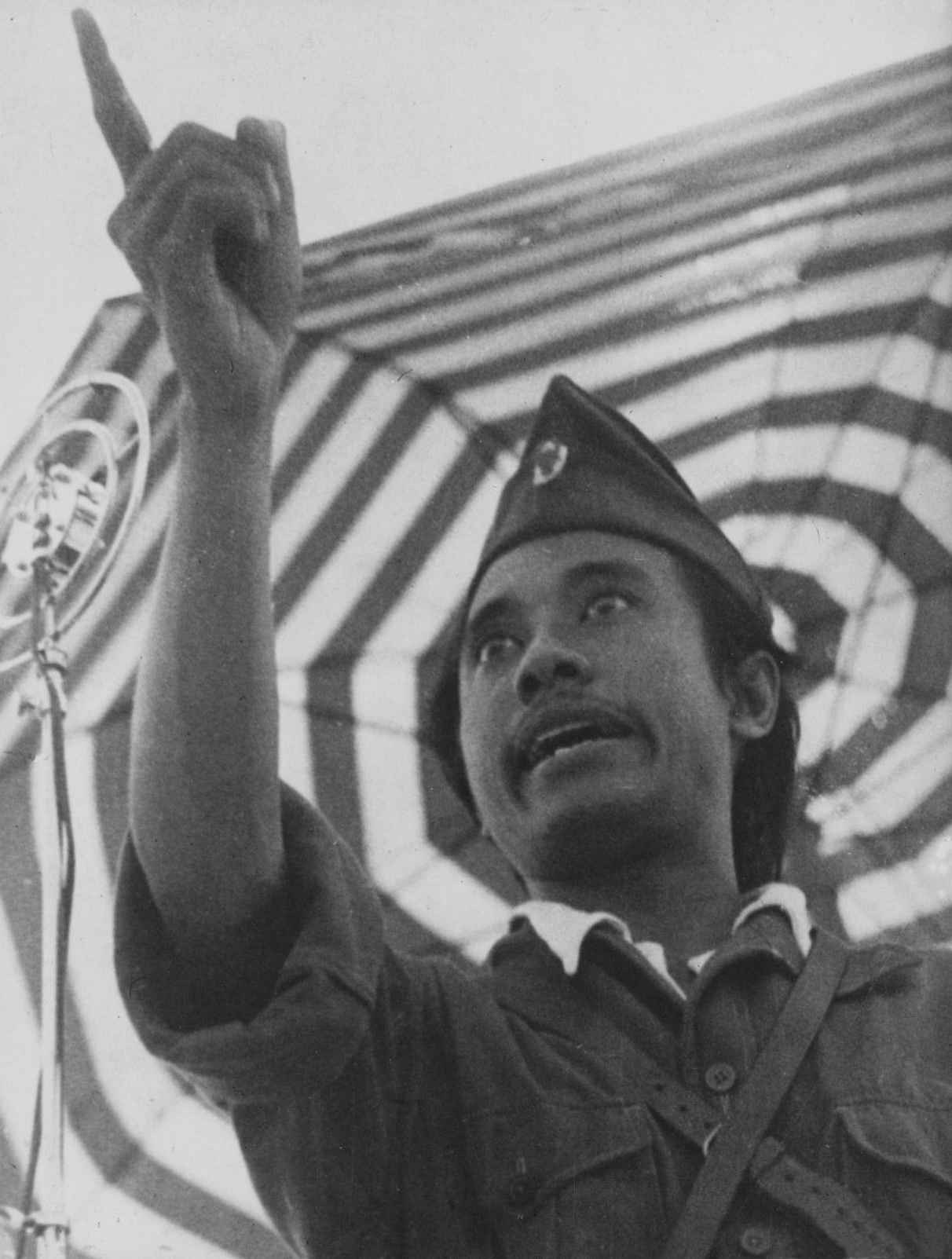
- Photo of Sutomo circa 1947, frequently used to illustrate articles about his 1945 speeches.

Minister of State for the Affairs of Former Indonesian Fighters
- In office 12 August 1955 – 24 March 1956
- President: Sukarno
- Prime Minister: Burhanuddin Harahap
- Succeeded by: Dahlan Ibrahim

Minister of Social Affairs (ad-interim)
- In office 18 January 1956 – 24 March 1956
- President: Sukarno
- Prime Minister: Burhanuddin Harahap
- Preceded by: Soedibjo
- Succeeded by: Fatah Jasin

Personal details
- Born: 3 October 1920 Soerabaja, Dutch East Indies
- Died: 7 October 1981 (aged 61) Mount Arafat, Saudi Arabia
- Party: Gerakan Rakyat Baru (New People's Movement); Pemuda Republik Indonesia (Youth of Indonesian Republic)
- Occupation: Journalist
- Awards: National Hero of Indonesia

Military service
- Allegiance: Indonesia
- Rank: Front Leader
- Commands: Indonesian People's Revolutionary Front
- Battles/wars: Indonesian National Revolution; Battle of Surabaya

Sutomo (3 October 1920 – 7 October 1981), also known as Bung Tomo (meaning Comrade or Brother Tomo), was an Indonesian revolutionary and military leader best known for his role in the Indonesian National Revolution against Dutch colonial rule. He played a central role in the Battle of Surabaya, which was fought between British and Indonesian forces from October to November 1945.

== Early life ==
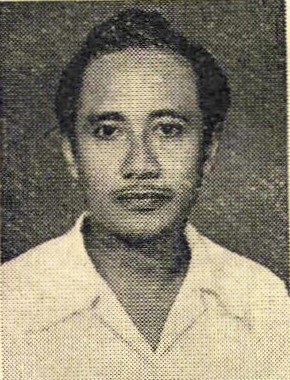
Official portrait, 1955

Sutomo was born in Kampung Blauran in the centre of Surabaya to a clerk father, Kartawan Tjiptowidjojo, and mother, Subastia, of mixed Javanese, Sundanese and Madurese descent. He had received Dutch secondary education before the Japanese occupation.

Alongside menial jobs, he joined the Indonesian Scouting organisation and at the age of seventeen became only the second person in the Dutch East Indies to achieve the rank of Pramuka Garuda, a rank achieved by only three Indonesians before the Japanese occupation during World War II.

== Japanese occupation ==
During the Japanese occupation period, Sutomo worked for the Dōmei Tsushin (the official news agency of the Empire of Japan) in Surabaya. He became famous for setting up Radio Pemberontakan (Resistance Radio), which promoted unity and fighting spirit among pemuda-pemuda Indonesia (Indonesian youth).

In 1944, Sutomo was chosen as a member of the Japanese-sponsored Gerakan Rakyat Baru (New People's Movement) and officer of Pemuda Republik Indonesia (Youth of Indonesian Republic).

== Indonesian National Revolution ==
=== Indonesian People's Revolutionary Front ===
On 12 October 1945, Sutomo founded and became a leader of Indonesian People's Revolutionary Front (Indonesian: Barisan Pemberontakan Rakyat Indonesia), abbreviated as BPRI, is an Indonesian militia, with its headquarters in Surabaya. BPRI was aimed at realizing and defending the Proclamation of Indonesian Independence, they rallied the people's resistance against the re-establishment of Dutch rule in Indonesia after the Surrender of Japan in World War II.

During the Netherlands Indies Civil Administration (NICA) occupation, in the early stages of the Indonesian National Revolution, in the Bersiap period, Sutomo encouraged atrocities against Indonesians of mixed European–Asian ancestry and personally supervised the summary executions of hundreds of civilians. These are archived eye witness testimony of the events of 22 October 1945.

=== Battle of Surabaya ===
When the battle broke out in Surabaya between Indonesian nationalists and British forces, he gave rousing speeches. Although the fighting ended in defeat for the Indonesians, the battle served to galvanise Indonesian and international opinion in support of the independence cause. Sutomo spurred thousands of Indonesians to action with his distinctive, emotional speaking-style of his radio broadcasts. His "clear, burning eyes, that penetrating, slightly nasal voice, or that hair-raising oratorical style that second only to Sukarno's in its emotional power".

There are conflicting accounts of Sutomo's whereabouts during the battle. His son claimed that he participated in the battle, but K'tut Tantri wrote in several books that he moved to Malang so he could continue giving radio speeches.

The battle for Surabaya was the bloodiest single engagement of the war, and demonstrated the determination of the rag-tag nationalist forces; their sacrificial resistance became a symbol and rallying cry for the revolution. 10 November 1945, the peak of the Battle of Surabaya, was later known as Hari Pahlawan (Heroes’ Day), to commemorate and honor the struggles of heroes and fighters in defending Indonesian independence.

Hey British soldiers! As long as the Indonesian bulls, the youth of Indonesia, have red blood that can make a piece of white cloth, red and white, we will never surrender. Friends, fellow fighters, especially the youth of Indonesia, we will fight on, we will expel the colonialists from our Indonesian land that we love... Long have we suffered, been exploited, trampled on. Now is the time for us to seize our independence. Our motto remains: FREEDOM OR DEATH. ALLAHU AKBAR!... ALLAHU AKBAR!... ALLAHU AKBAR!... FREEDOM!"

Bung Tomo's speech, 9 November 1945.

== Post-independence ==
In 1955, Sutomo become a minister of state in the Burhanuddin Harahap Cabinet between August 1955 and March 1956, an appointment which pleased cabinet supporters because of his nationalist credentials. However, his relationship with President Sukarno had already begun to sour in 1952 after he offended the president by asking about the president's personal relationship with Hartini, a married woman who later became Sukarno's fourth wife. Sutomo would later sue Sukarno in 1960, due to the president's decision to dissolve the People's Representative Council.

After the 1956, Sutomo emerged again as a national figure during the 1965 overthrow of Sukarno. Initially, he supported Suharto, but later opposed aspects of the New Order regime. On 11 April 1978, he was detained by the government for his outspoken criticism of corruption and abuses of power; upon his release three years later, however, Sutomo continued to loudly voice his criticisms. He said that he did not want to be buried in the Heroes' Cemetery because it was full of "fairweather heroes" who had lacked the courage to defend the nation at times of crisis, but when peace came appeared in public to glorify their achievements.

== Death ==
On 7 October 1981, he died in Mecca, Saudi Arabia, while on Hajj pilgrimage. Before his death, Sutomo managed to finish a draft of his own dissertation on the role of religion in village-level development. His family and friends had his body returned to Indonesia. Although his reputation and military rank gave him the right to be buried in the Heroes' Cemetery, he was laid to rest in public burial ground at Ngagel, Surabaya, East Java.

== Family ==
On 9 June 1947, Sutomo married Sulistina in Malang, East Java. He was known as a devoutly religious father of four who took religious knowledge seriously throughout his life.

== See also ==
- Battle of Surabaya
- Indonesian National Revolution
- History of Indonesia

== Bibliography ==
- Feith, Herbert (2009) [1962], The Decline of Constitutional Democracy in Indonesia, Equinox Publishing (Asia) Pte Ltd, ISBN 978-979-3780-45-0
- Frederick, William H. (April 1982). "In Memoriam: Sutomo". Indonesia. 33. Cornell University Southeast Asia Program: 127–128. Archived from the original on July 28, 2013.
- Soetomo, Sulistina (1995). Bung Tomo, Suamiku [Bung Tomo, My Husband] (in Indonesian). Pustaka Sinar Harapan. ISBN 978-979-416-313-9.
