= Pramuka Movement of Indonesia =

National scouting organization of Indonesia

- Official emblem

- Sprouting coconut seed, its simplified logo
- Headquarters: Gambir, Jakarta
- Country: Indonesia
- Founded: 14 August 1961; 65 years ago (first public parade of unified scout movement)
- Founders: Government of Indonesia under the Sukarno Guided Democracy administration Hamengkubuwono IX, first Chief Scout
- Membership: 25,272,760 (2022)
- Chief Scout: Police Commissioner Gen. (ret.) Budi Waseso
- Secretary-general: Maj. Gen. (ret.) Bachtiar
- Affiliation: World Organization of the Scout Movement
- Website www.pramuka.or.id (National Headquarters) www.pramuka.id (Official news site)

Ensign of Pramuka Movement

The Pramuka Movement of Indonesia (Indonesian: Gerakan Pramuka Indonesia, GPI), officially the Praja Muda Karana Scouting Movement (Gerakan Kepanduan Praja Muda Karana), is the national scouting organization of Indonesia.

Scouting was founded in the Dutch East Indies in 1912, and Indonesia became a member of the World Organization of the Scout Movement (WOSM) in 1953. Regulated by the Pramuka Movement Act of 2010, all elementary and secondary schools must operate a scouting program; and membership was compulsory for students in elementary and secondary schools from 2013 to present. It has 25,272,760 members (as of 2022), making it the world's largest Scout association.

The organization was established on 14 August 1961 as a part of the late Sukarno government's attempt to create a Scouting-like movement "freed from (the influences of) Baden-Powell", a goal largely reversed under the succeeding Suharto government. August 14 is celebrated as Pramuka Day to honour the organization's first public parade in 1961, wherein independence hero Sultan Hamengkubuwono IX of Yogyakarta was appointed as the first Chief Scout of the GPI.

Unlike other Scouting organizations, the GPI uses a full-handed military salute instead of the usual Scout sign and salute, honoring the fighting youth of the foundational organizations that formed the GPI for their service during the long Indonesian National Revolution (1945–49).

== Etymology ==
The name Pramuka was derived from the acronym of Praja muda karana (Sanskrit for 'young people willing to work'). But before this abbreviation was established, the word was originally proposed by Hamengkubuwono IX from the Javanese term poromuko (pronounced [pramukɔ] lit. 'front line soldier'). In W.J.S Poerwadarminta's 1939 Javanese Bausastra Dictionary, pramuka means pangarep or lelurah, which means "leader". The word Pramuka in Indonesian is often used as a general term for scouting.

== History ==
=== Colonial period ===
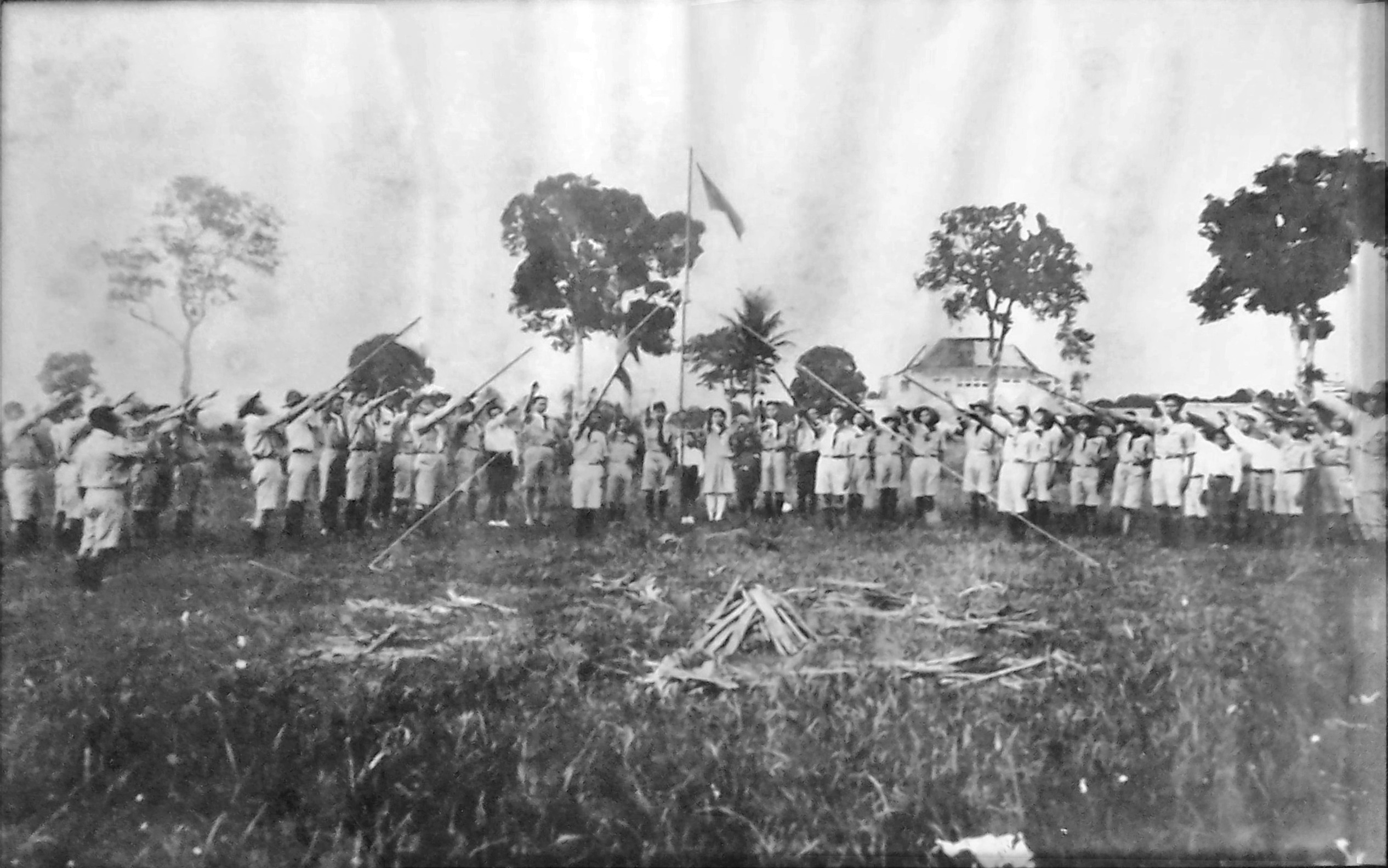
Indonesian Scouting organisations around the 1920s.

Boy Scouts from the Netherlands Indies at the World Scout Jamboree in the Netherlands (1937)

Scouting came to Dutch East Indies in 1912, as a branch of the Nederlandse Padvinders Organisatie (NPO, Netherlands Pathfinder Organisation). After the outbreak of World War I had its own large quartier, it was called the Vereeniging Nederlandsch Indische Padvinders (Association of Dutch Indies Pathfinders). Other Scouting organizations were established by the Indonesia Scouts in 1916. As the Dutch East Indies, Indonesia had been a branch of the Netherlands Scout Association, yet Scouting was very popular, and had achieved great numbers and standards.

The Scouting organisation initiated by Indonesians was the Javaansche Padvinders Organisatie (JPO); established at the initiative of S.P. Mangkunegara VII in 1916.

As scouting organizations sprung up, scouting became inline with the national movement. Scouting organizations that sprung are the Padvinder Muhammadiyah which in 1920 changed its name to Hizbul Wathan (HW); Nationale Padvinderij founded by Budi Utomo; Syarikat Islam established Syarikat Islam Afdeling Padvinderij which was later changed to Syarikat Islam Afdeling Pandu and is better known as SIAP, Nationale Islamietische Padvinderij (NATIPIJ) established by Jong Islamieten Bond (JIB) and Indonesisch Nationale Padvinders Organisatie (INPO) established by Pemuda Indonesia.

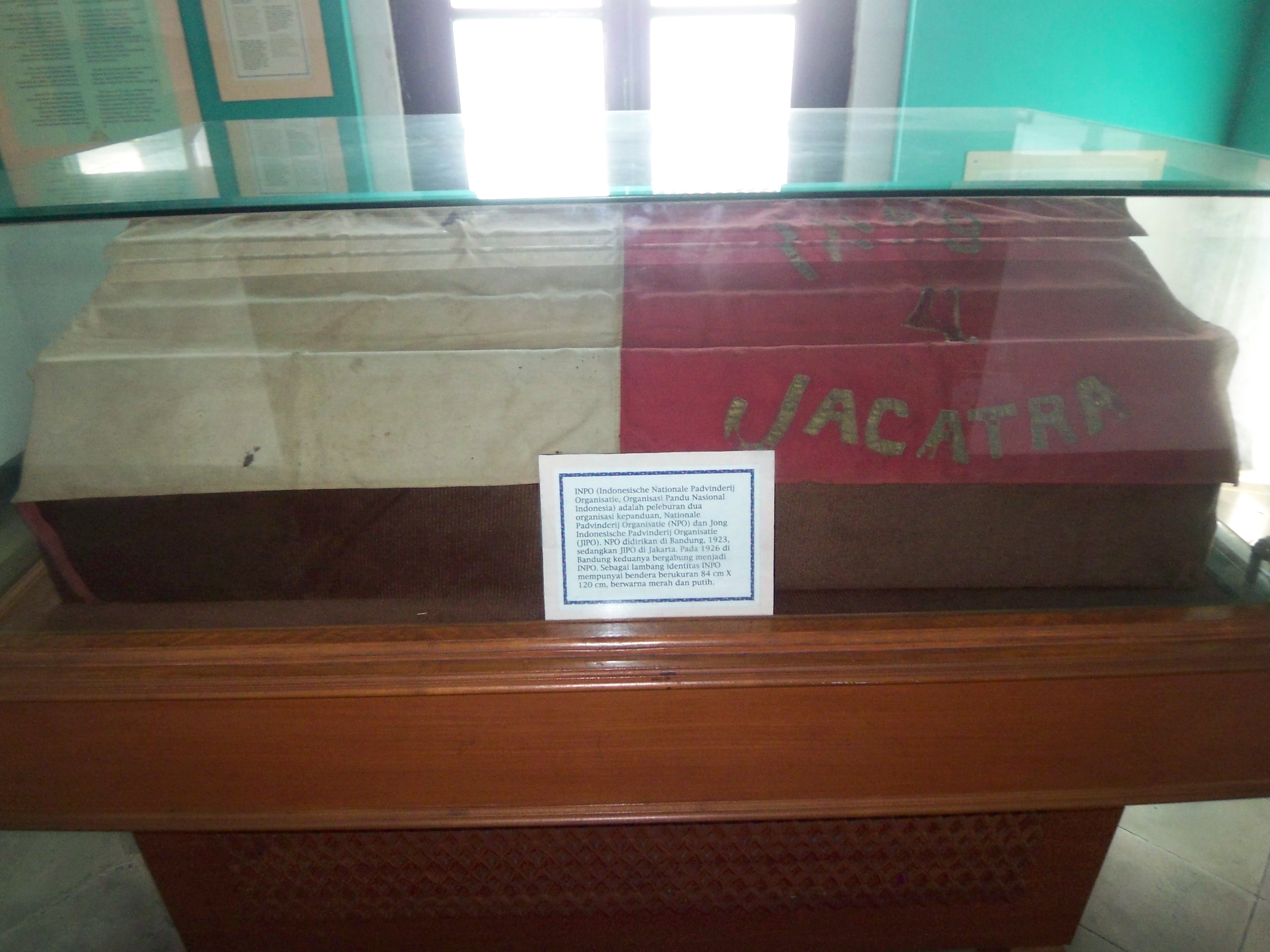
Flag of Indonesische Nationale Padvinderij Organisatie

In 1923, the Scouting movement in Indonesia gained ground by the full establishment of the (Dutch) Nationale Padvinderij Organisatie (NPO) in Bandung. In Jakarta, the Jong Indonesische Padvinders-Organisatie (JIPO) was established in the same year. These two forerunner organisations of scouting in Indonesia merged into one, named the Indonesische Nationale Padvinderij Organisatie (INPO) in Bandung in 1926. Outside Java, West Sumatran religious school students founded El-Hilaal scouting in 1928.

The desire for unity for Indonesian scouting organisations at that time appeared to begin with the formation of the Persaudaraan Antara Pandu Indonesia (PAPI), a federation of Pandu Kebangsaan, INPO, SIAP, NATIPIJ, and PPS on 23 May 1928. This federation did not last long due to the intention of fusion. As a result, the Kepanduan Bangsa Indonesia (KBI) was founded in 1930 by figures from Jong Java Padvinders / Pandu Kebangsaan (JJP / PK), INPO, and PPS. PAPI later evolved into the Badan Pusat Persaudaran Kepanduan Indonesia (BPPKI, Central Body of the Indonesian Scouting Fraternity) in April 1938.

Between 1928-1935, the Indonesian scouting movement emerged, both with a national and religious mindset. scouts with a national mindset can be noted as Pandu Indonesia (PI), Padvinders Organisatie Pasundan (POP), Pandu Kesultanan (PK), Sinar Pandu Kita (SPK), and Kepanduan Rakyat Indonesia (KRI). Meanwhile, those who follow the religious mindset founded Pandu Ansor, Al Wathoni, Hizbul Wathan, Indonesian Islamic Scouting (KII), Islamitische Padvinders Organisatie (IPO), Tri Darma (Christian), Indonesian Catholic Scouting (KAKI), Indonesian Christian Scouting (KMI).

In an effort to foster unity, the Central Board of the Indonesian Scouting Fraternity (BPPKI) planned an "All-Indonesian Jamboree". This plan underwent several changes both in the time of implementation and the name of the activity, which was later agreed to be replaced with Perkemahan Kepanduan Indonesia Oemoem (abbreviated as PERKINO) and held on 19-23 July 1941 in Yogyakarta.

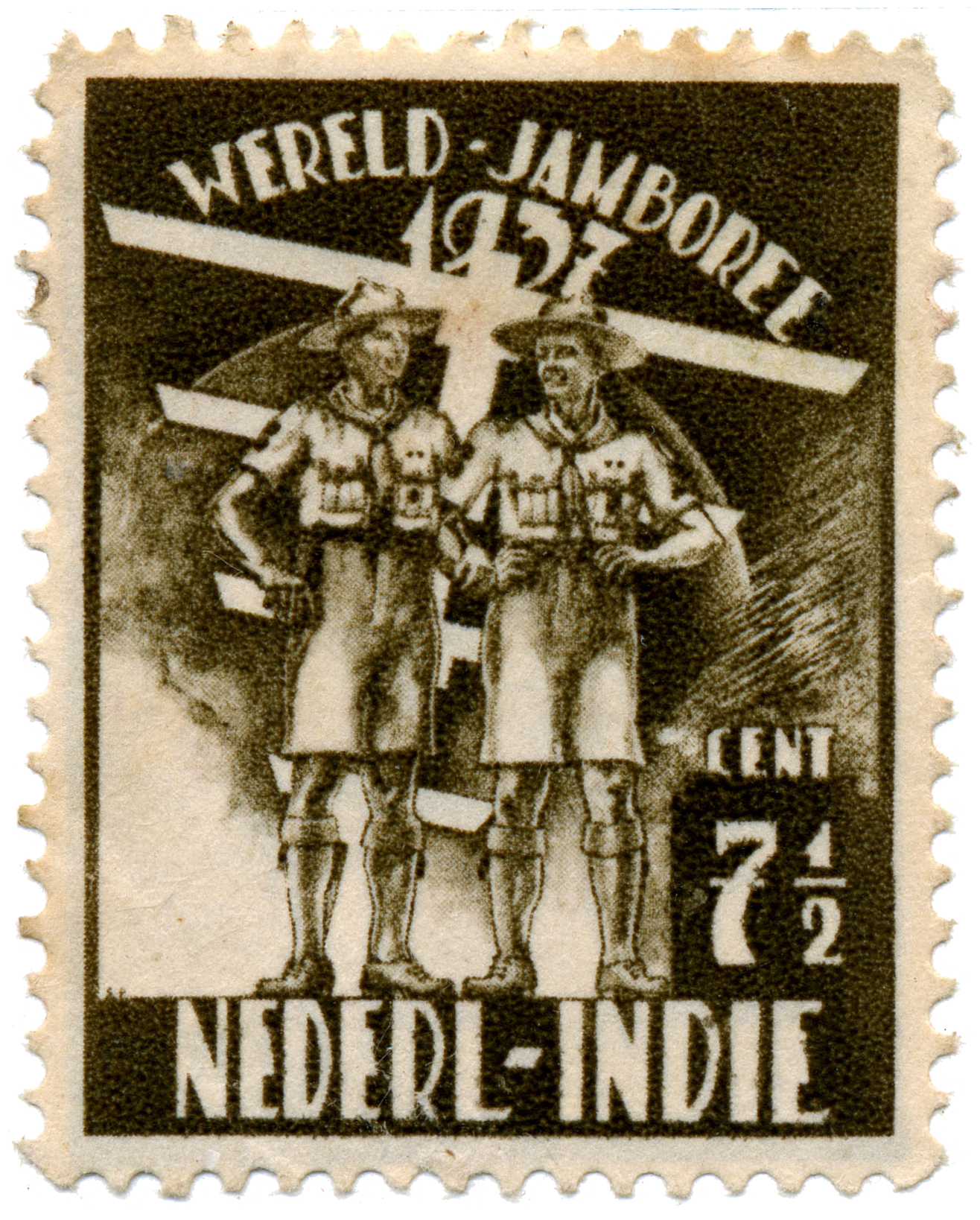
Netherlands Indies stamp from 1937

=== Formation ===
When Indonesia became an independent country, there were more than 60 separate Boy Scout and Girl Guide organizations. Most were directly affiliated with some certain political parties or social groups. And there was one national organization - the People's Scouts (Pandu Rakyat Indonesia), founded on 27–29 December 1945, just almost half a year since independence, in its 1st Congress in Surakarta. Attempts were made to unify all Scout organizations into one. The fact that Indonesia is made up of many islands made administration and supervision difficult, and the Japanese occupation caused some twenty separate Scout organizations to spring up, and it took time for them to coalesce. In September 1951, in a Jakarta conference, the People's Scouts, recognized by the Ministry of Education twice in 1947 and 1950 as the official Scout organization of the young nation, and the other 12 of the stronger Scout and Guide organizations nationwide met and decided to found a federating body to satisfy national and international needs. Representatives of these organizations decided that the time had come to merge into one national organization for Indonesian Scouting and Guiding.

With their cooperation, the Ikatan Pandu Indonesia (Ipindo, Indonesian Scouting Union) came into being. Government approval of Ipindo was granted on 22 February 1952, and President Sukarno consented to become patron of the unifying and correlating National Scout Council. With the formation of Ipindo, Indonesia became a full member of the World Organization of the Scout Movement in 1953 as an organization of its Asia-Pacific Region. In 1955 the Ipindo hosted the country's first Scout Jamboree in Pasar Minggu, South Jakarta.

With the beginning of the Guided Democracy period came a period of unification of all Scout and Guide organizations into one. On 9 March 1961, in the State Palace of Jakarta, in the presence of Ipinido representatives and those of other organizations, President Sukarno gave his blessing for the unification of Indonesian Scouting and Guiding into one national organization. With the April 1961 decision to merge the Fadjar Harapan (a pioneer movement founded in 1959) and other organizations into Ipindo, the establishment of a single Scout Movement organization in Indonesia called Gerakan Pramuka was officially completed.

On 20 May 1961, President Sukarno signed a presidential regulation formally declaring the new Gerakan Pramuka as the official Scout and Guide organization in Indonesia and official heir and successor to the legacies of the former Scout and Guide organizations of the republic, inheriting thus Indonesia's membership in WOSM from Ipindo. On 30 July, at the Istora Gelora Bung Karno in Jakarta, the GPI was officially launched as the country's national co-ed Scouting and Guiding organization on the basis of the existing organizations in the republic.

Gerakan Pramuka is a former member of the World Association of Girl Guides and Girl Scouts, having left WAGGGS and added the girls' program to WOSM also in 2002.

After Sri Sultan Hamengkubuwono IX, other Indonesian recipients of the Bronze Wolf, the only distinction of the World Organization of the Scout Movement, awarded by the World Scout Committee for exceptional services to world Scouting, include Abdul Azis Saleh in 1978, John Beng Kiat Liem in 1982 and retired Lieutenant General Mashudi in 1985.

Gerakan Pramuka was made into a compulsory extracurricular activity in 2013 with the adoption of Kurikulum 2013, the Indonesian school curriculum of 2013. Despite that, schools, especially elementary schools, have made Pramuka into a compulsory extracurricular activity long before this policy. With the change into Kurikulum Merdeka (Independent Curriculum), starting from 2024, students are no longer required to participate in Pramuka, but it must still be offered by schools.

=== Founding organizations ===
By the time the GPI was founded in 1961, the following organizations helped in its formation:

- Ikatan Pandu Indonesia (Ipindo)
- Fadjar Harapan
- Persatuan Kepanduan Puteri Indonesia (PKPI)
- Persatuan Organisasi Pandu Puteri Indonesia (POPPINDO)
- Hizbul Wathan (GPHW) of Muhammadiyah, later separated from GPI in 1999

== Programme ==
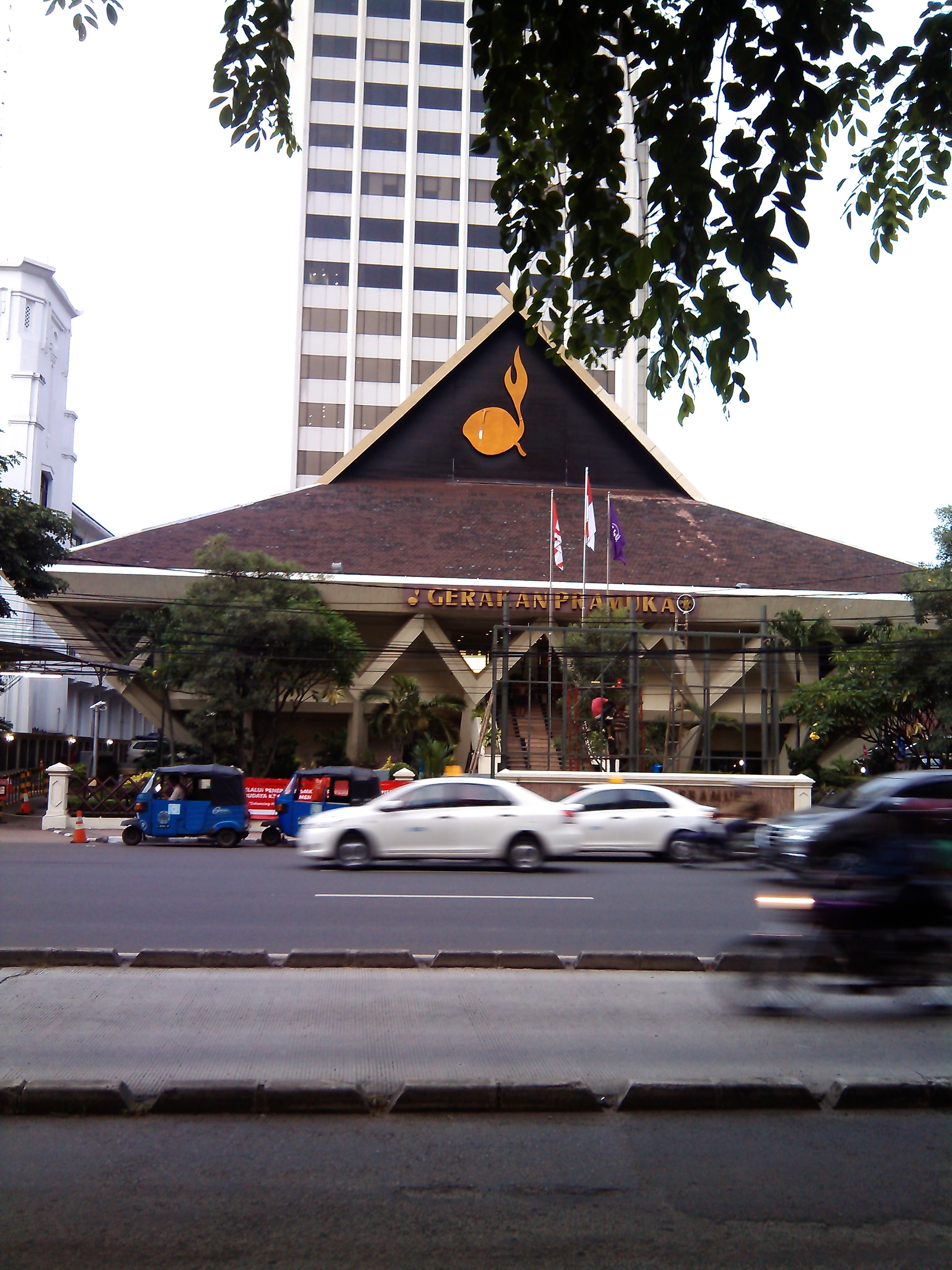
Headquarters of the National Quarter (Kwartir Nasional) of Pramuka Movement, in Jakarta

The Pramuka Movement incorporates both boys and girls. It is an educational movement through Scouting activities, the education being directed toward a new, just, peaceful and prosperous Indonesian community based on the national ideology. Activities of the boys and girls are conducted separately from one another. They have joint activities whenever possible and necessary. Management of the Scout Movement is carried out by the National Quarter (Kwartir Nasional or Kwarnas).

Education for young members is carried out through activities to achieve General Skill Requirements (Syarat Kecakapan Umum or SKU) and Special Skill Requirements (Syarat Kecakapan Khusus or SKK) (merit badge system) towards achieving Garuda Scout.

To achieve the goals of Scouting, activities are carried out on the group and national level. Routine activities are focused on the development of character, patriotism, physical fitness, skill and intelligence of the Scouts themselves which are very important for their future life. Activities of the special troops are organized in order to develop specific personal interest and talent and enable them to serve the community with the knowledge, ability and skill he/she have learned.

The Scouts take an active part in community development service projects. They take an active part in combating illiteracy. The success of the campaign against illiteracy in one province, gained the Scouts worldwide recognition and won them a UNESCO award.

The Scouts also participate in the drive to improve health and nutrition in the community, especially children under five years of age. Acting as extension workers, they practice how to raise cattle, fish, breed hens and grow vegetables.

=== Membership badge ===
The Scout emblem incorporates the seed of the coconut palm, a common native Indonesian plant and all parts of which are used in Indonesian everyday life, symbolizing the philosophy of a true Scout, who must make him or herself useful in all aspects of life. The seed form represents the growing spirit, physical toughness, adaptability, and high aspiration of the Scout. The logo is in maroon. The logo is the basis of the wider membership badge, which also incorporates the star, rice paddy and cotton from the national coat of arms Garuda Pancasila.

=== Age groups ===
Gerakan Pramuka is divided in two major educational groups: the member section and the adult section. The first is divided in further age-groups with different educational systems, the second provides the leaders and supports the younger members.

The officially recognized age-groups are:

- Cub Scouts (Pramuka Siaga) ages 7 to 10 or equal to elementary school's 1st to 3rd grade, consisting of:
  - Siaga Mula
  - Siaga Bantu
  - Siaga Tata
- Scouts (Pramuka Penggalang) – ages 11 to 15 or equal to elementary school's 4th to 6th grade and junior high school's 7th to 9th grade, consisting of:
  - Penggalang Ramu
  - Penggalang Rakit
  - Penggalang Terap
- Rover Scouts (Pramuka Penegak) – ages 16 to 20 or equal to senior high school's 10th to 12th grade, consisting of:
  - Penegak Bantara
  - Penegak Laksana
- Venturer Scouts (Pramuka Pandega) – ages 21 to 25 or equal to academy or university students.
- Adult members – ages 26 and older

A much younger level, Beaver Scouts (Pramuka Prasiaga), exists in some provincial Scout Councils since it was started in Central Java in 2010 but has been a recognized part of the GPI movement with a growing following. It is made up of children ages 4 to 7 or equal to the kindergarten level.

=== Awards ===
Activities are mainly carried out to achieve advancement through the Syarat kecakapan Umum (SKU) or Advancement Badge and Syarat Kecakapan Khusus (TKK) or Merit Badge system. The highest rank in each age group is Pramuka Garuda (Eagle Scout equivalent).

=== Rover and Venture Scout Special Unit ===
In Pramuka, there are Rover and Venturer Scouts Special Units called Satuan Karya (SAKA). In those units, the Rovers and Venturers are able to learn various skills to be specialist that are useful for their future careers as well as to provide services to the community. There are ten different units:

- Law Enforcement Special Unit (Saka Bhayangkara) - in coordination with the Indonesian National Police and the Civil Service Police Units
- Air Mindedness Special Unit (Saka Dirgantara) - in coordination with the Indonesian Air Force and the Ministry of Transportation
- Sea and Maritime Special Unit (Saka Bahari) - in coordination with the Indonesian Navy, the Ministry of Transportation and the Ministry of Maritime Affairs and Fisheries
- Health Care And Services Special Unit (Saka Bakti Husada) - in coordination with the Ministry of Health
- Population And Family Planning Special Unit (Saka Kencana/Saka Keluarga Berencana) - in coordination with the National Population And Family Planning Board and Ministry of Health
- Plantation And Agriculture Special Unit (Saka Taruna Bumi) - in coordination with the Ministry of Agriculture
- Forest Preserver Special Unit (Saka Wana Bakti) - in coordination with the Ministry of Environment and Forestry
- Homeland Defense Special Unit (Saka Wira Kartika) - in coordination with the Indonesian Army
- Tourism Guides Special Unit (Saka Pariwisata) - in coordination with the National Police, Civil Service Police and the Ministry of Tourism (Indonesia)
- Education and Culture Special Unit (Saka Widya Budaya Bakti) - in coordination with the Ministry of Education and Culture
- Environment Special Unit (Saka Kalpataru) - in coordination with the Ministry of Environment and Forestry
- Information and Communications Technology Special Unit (Saka Telematika) - in coordination with the Ministry of Communications and Information Technology
- Search and Rescue Special Unit (Saka SAR) - in coordination with National Search and Rescue Agency

=== Scout Promise (Tri Satya) ===
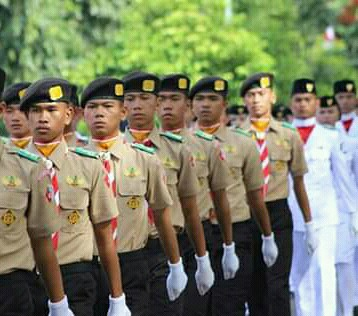
The scouts serving as colour advance platoon for the Paskibra

On My Honour, I promise that I will do my best to:

- Fulfill my obligation to God and the Republic of Indonesia, and to obey Pancasila
- Help other people and get involved in community building
- Obey the Scout Law.

=== Scout Law (Dasa Darma) ===
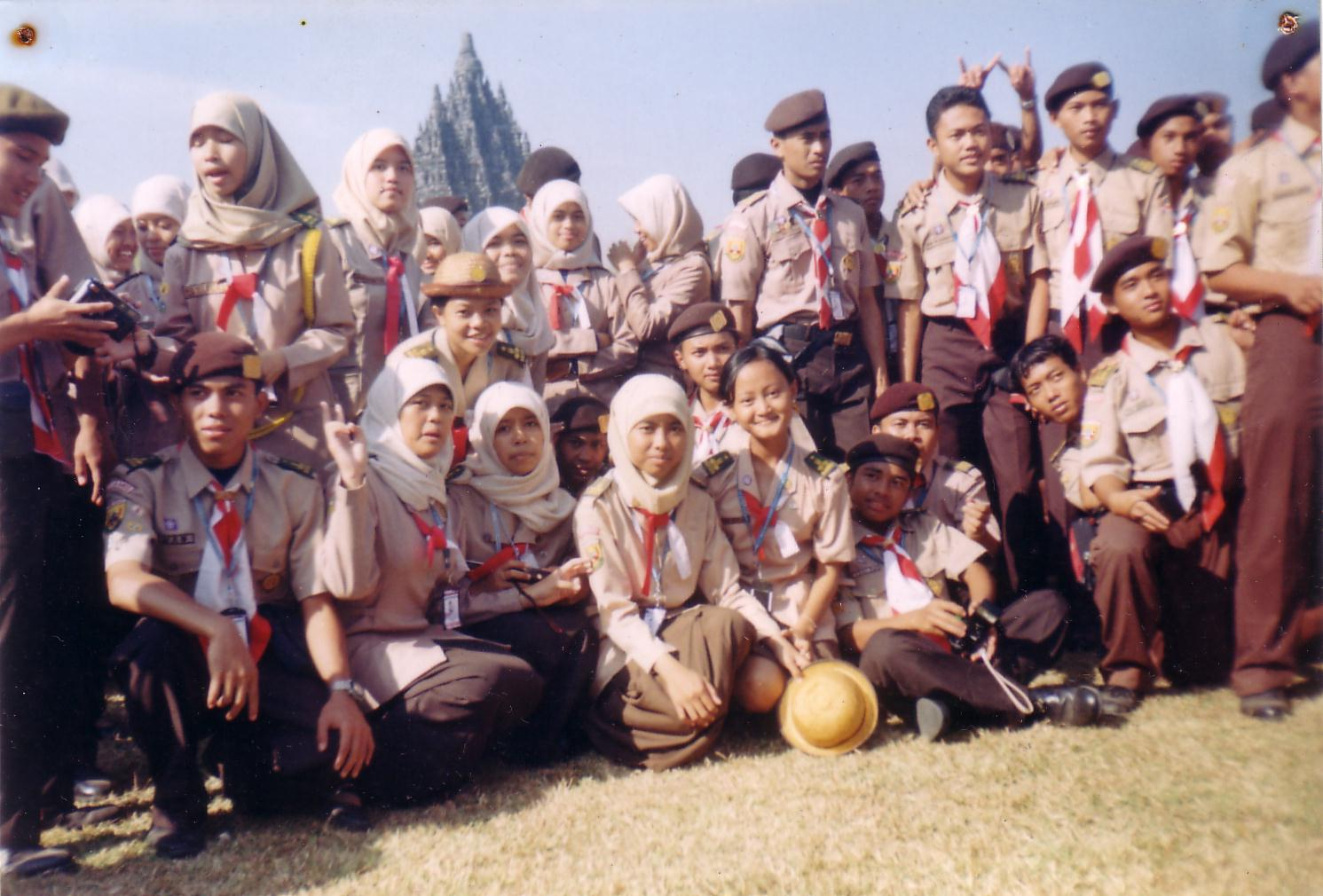
Indonesian Scouts at Prambanan (8th National Rover Moot) in 2003

1. Belief in God the Almighty (Takwa Kepada Tuhan Yang Maha Esa)
2. Preserving nature and loving each other (Cinta Alam dan Kasih Sayang Sesama Manusia)
3. Becoming an affable and knightly patriot (Patriot yang Sopan dan Kesatria)
4. Becoming obedient and collegial (Patuh dan Suka Bermusyawarah)
5. Helping others with compliance and resilience (Rela Menolong dan Tabah)
6. Becoming diligent, skilled and cheerful (Rajin, Terampil, dan Gembira)
7. Becoming provident and simple (Hemat, Cermat, dan Bersahaja)
8. Exercising discipline, bravery and faithfulness (Disiplin, Berani, dan Setia)
9. Becoming accountable and trustworthy (Bertanggung Jawab dan Dapat Dipercaya)
10. Having purity in thoughts, words and actions (Suci dalam Pikiran, Perkataan, dan Perbuatan)

=== Councils ===
Gerakan Pramuka operates and maintains 34 province-level territorial councils (kwartir daerah) each corresponding to provincial borders and a National Council or Headquarters (Kwartir Nasional) for top-level staff and employees.

The insignia of the 34 councils west to east in geographic order, except for North Kalimantan and newer Papuan provinces, generally correspond to the coat-of-arms of their province

=== National Special Scout Jamborees ===
A National Special Scout Jamboree is held every five years for disabled Scouts. The seventh National Special Scouts Jamboree was held in 2007, in East Jakarta. The first jamboree of this sort to be held in Indonesia was in 1972.

== Controversies ==
In July 2017, the Indonesian government suspended support for Gerakan Pramuka Indonesia after Chairman of the Scout National Quarter (Kwarnas) Adhyaksa Dault expressed support for Hizb-ut Tahrir, as Hizb-ut Tahrir was held to be against Pancasila. Financial assistance was suspended pending clarification from Adhyaksa Dault over his presence at a Hizb-ut Tahrir rally in 2013 and interview to a Hizb-ut Tahrir videographer expressing "Caliphate is the teaching of the Prophet. If God is willing, with or without our help, the caliphate will rise. Our ways may be different but our goal is the same. That is why I'm here. We keep making small changes. We have to make big changes. World order must be changed. We must impose sharia."

== International units in Indonesia ==
In addition, there are American Boy Scouts in Jakarta linked to the Direct Service branch of the Boy Scouts of America, which supports units around the world. There is also group from British Scouting Overseas which support scouting at British School Jakarta.

== See also ==
- Bung Tomo
- Hamengkubuwono IX, former vice president and founder of the GPI
- Paskibraka
