= TKK (disambiguation) =

TKK can stand for:

- Kuningas Pähkinä, a stage name of Finnish rap artist
- My Life with the Thrill Kill Kult band's nickname
- Teknillinen korkeakoulu (Helsinki University of Technology) - a former Finnish university
- IATA Airport Code for Chuuk International Airport
- Tanda Kecakapan Khusus, Indonesian Scout merit badges
- Tokyu Corporation (Tokyo KyuKo Railway)
- Toyo Kisen Kaisha (Oriental Steamship Company)
