= Muhammad Yasin =

Indonesian police chief (1920–2012)

Personal details
- Born: 9 June 1920 Baubau, Southeast Celebes, Dutch East Indies
- Died: 3 May 2012 (aged 91) Jakarta, Indonesia
- Spouse: Siti Aliyah Kessing
- Children: 4
- Awards: National Hero of Indonesia

Military service
- Allegiance: Indonesia
- Branch/service: National Police Agency
- Rank: Commissaries general
- Unit: Special Police Troops
- Battles/wars: Battle of Surabaya (1945); Indonesian National Revolution (1945-1949)

Commissaries general Muhammad Jasin (also Moehammed Yasin; 9 June 1920 – 3 May 2012) was a National Hero of Indonesia and died on 3 May 2012 in RS Polri Kramat Jati, and he was buried in Taman Makam Pahlawan Kalibata. He is regarded as the founder of the Brimob Polri, which he formed from the existing Japanese-controlled Special Police Corps (Tokubetsu Keisatsutai). For his actions against the Japanese occupiers and later participation in the Indonesian National Revolution, he was bestowed the National Hero of Indonesia award, along with Bernard Wilhelm Lapian, Mas Isman, I Gusti Ngurah Made Agung and Ki Bagus Hadikusumo, by President Joko Widodo on 5 November 2015.

In August 1945, Police Inspector Muhammad Yasin commanded a special police corps named "Pasukan Polisi Istimewa" (Special Police Troops) at Surabaya, with the task of disarming remnants of the Japanese Imperial Army and protecting the chief of state and the capital city. Yasin's special troops fought in the revolution and were the first Indonesian military police unit to engage in the Battle of Surabaya (1945).

Since 2024, 21 August has been declared Police's Struggle Day in Surabaya.
