= K'tut Tantri =

Scottish American woman

- Born: Muriel Stuart Walker; February 19, 1898; Glasgow, Scotland
- Died: July 27, 1997 (aged 99); Sydney, Australia
- Other name: "Soerabaja Sue"
- Citizenship: Australia
- Occupations: broadcaster, memoirist
- Spouse: Karl Jenning Pearson
- Writing career
- Genre: Memoir
- Notable work: Revolt in Paradise

K'tut Tantri (19 February 1898 – 27 July 1997), born Muriel Stuart Walker, was a Scottish American woman who was best known for her work as a radio broadcaster for the Indonesian Republicans during the Indonesian National Revolution. Due to this work, she was referred to by the nickname "Surabaya Sue" among British and Dutch news correspondents.

== Biography ==
=== Early life ===
Muriel Stuart Walker was born in Glasgow in the United Kingdom and emigrated with her mother to California following the First World War. She worked as a scriptwriter in Hollywood. Between 1930 and 1932, she also married an American man named Karl Jenning Pearson, who died in 1957. In 1932, she left the United States to begin a new life on the Indonesian island of Bali, where she would spend the next fifteen years. Her decision to emigrate to Bali was inspired by watching a film called Bali: the last paradise, which gave a utopian image of the island, which was then part of the Netherlands East Indies. She wanted to become an artist there and abandoned her life in suburban America.

=== Bali ===
During her time in Bali, Muriel Stuart Walker was adopted by a local rajah named Anak Agung Nura. She also adopted the Balinese name K'tut Tantri, which translated into English as "fourth-born child." During her time in Indonesia, Tantri also became fluent in the Balinese and Indonesian languages. Later, she established a hotel in Kuta where she developed a fondness for the Indonesians and an aversion towards the Dutch, whom she regarded as "arrogant colonialists." She also became acquainted with several Western expatriate artists including Walter Spies and Adrien le Mayeur.

K'tut Tantri gave multiple conflicting accounts of her response to the Japanese occupation of the Dutch East Indies. Indonesian critics accused her of collaborating with the Japanese and even of holding "comfort women" in her hotel, while she claimed that she herself was imprisoned as a "comfort woman," which did happen to some Dutch prisoners, and even tortured. Biographers were unable to find first-hand knowledge of her wartime activities, and the relevant Japanese records have apparently been destroyed. In later years Tantri was able to produce a set of handmade playing cards made of palm leaves and mud which she said she had made in Japanese prison, and which did resemble similar objects made by Indonesian prisoners.

=== The Indonesian Revolution ===
Following the Second World War, Tantri was recruited into the Indonesian nationalist cause by rebels affiliated with the Indonesian guerrilla leader Bung Tomo. She became a radio broadcaster for the Voice of Free Indonesia. Due to her work for the Indonesian government, she became known as "Surabaya Sue" among the British and Dutch forces occupying Java; a reference to the Japanese propaganda broadcasters dubbed Tokyo Rose. Tantri's broadcasts were invariably serious or philosophical in content, and Western correspondents compared them favorably to the lightweight propaganda of Tokyo Rose. In addition, Tantri contributed articles to an English-language magazine produced by the Republicans, which was also called the Voice of Free Indonesia. She witnessed the Battle of Surabaya as personal interpreter and radio broadcaster for Sutomo, before being recruited into Amir Sjarifuddin's more professional Indonesian Department of Information. Adam Malik praised her courage in collaborating with the guerrilla leaders while under fire from Dutch and British armies.

Later, she joined President Sukarno's Republican administration as a speech writer and broadcaster. She also took a personal liking to Sukarno's oratory and charismatic personality. Tantri directed the independence movement's English-language propaganda away from Third World sources of inspiration such as the 1919 Egyptian revolution, Gandhi's satyagraha, and the Arab Revolt, and towards analogies to the American Revolution, Thomas Paine, and the beliefs of Abraham Lincoln. Her rhetoric used in Sukarno's speeches appealed to American audiences with invocations of America's own liberal traditions and the right to self-government. Eventually, America withheld Marshall Plan funds to force the Netherlands to recognize Indonesian independence.

In her memoirs, Tantri claimed, among other things, that she had successfully exposed a plot by pro-Dutch Indonesians to overthrow Sukarno and install Hamengkubuwono IX, the Sultan of Yogyakarta, as the new President. In January 1947, Tantri took part in an Indonesian operation to sail a boat through the Dutch naval blockade to reach British-controlled Singapore. From there, she and the other Indonesian delegates had planned to travel to India or Australia to publicize the Indonesian story to the United Nations. She sailed from the port of Tegal in East Java in a boat that was captained by a pro-Indonesian Ambonese captain known as "Captain Ambon" and a sympathetic British skipper. However, this plan to travel to Australia did not eventuate since the travels funds promised to her by the Indonesian Ministry of Defence never materialized.

During her time in Singapore, K'tut Tantri was interviewed by Earle Growder and Eddy Dunstan, two journalists from the Straits Times newspaper. Since she lacked proper documents other than a passport issued by the Indonesian Republic, Tantri had to fake her way through the Singaporean immigration authorities by assuming the identity of an intoxicated woman who was the partner of a Chinese trader. Tantri subsequently reported her case to the Singapore Criminal Investigation Department which provided her with temporary identity papers. Tantri also took the credit for exposing a corrupt Indonesian agent who had been pocketing from the sale of sugar used to raise funds for the Indonesian Republic.

While in Singapore, K'tut Tantri met Abdul Monem, a representative from the Egyptian government and the Arab League, who had been sent by his government to extend formal diplomatic recognition to the Indonesian Republic. Since the Dutch and British consuls in Singapore had refused to help him travel to Yogyakarta, she and a sympathetic English businessman managed to charter a Philippines-registered aircraft for the sum of S$10,000, which she claimed the Indonesian Ministry of Defence would reimburse. This same aircraft later brought her back to Singapore along with the Indonesian Foreign Minister, Agus Salim, who was on his way to New Delhi to meet the Indian Prime Minister Jawaharlal Nehru. Throughout the duration of the Indonesian National Revolution, K'tut would make several trips between Indonesia and Singapore during several secret missions for the Republic.

=== Death and legacy ===
A few years later, K'tut Tantri found her way to Australia via Singapore where she helped publicize the Indonesian republican cause among sympathetic Australians. After obtaining an American passport from the United States Consul in Sydney, she returned to the United States where she published a memoir, Revolt in Paradise, in 1960. The book quickly became a bestseller and was widely translated. For the next thirty years, she worked with many film producers in America, Britain, and Australia, to make Revolt in Paradise into a film, but in each case negotiations became protracted as she made many demands of the filmmakers, rights issues frequently arose, and none of the projects moved to production. She spent her last years at a nursing home in Sydney, Australia where she died on 27 July 1997. Prior to her death, she was befriended by the Australian academic Tim Lindsey, who struggled to confirm some of the hyperbolic claims in her memoir.

Following her death, she was cremated following a non-religious memorial service on 9 August 1997. Her coffin was draped by the Indonesian flag and Balinese yellow and white clothes. Her funeral was attended by the deputy Indonesian Ambassador to Australia, by Bill Morrison the former Australian Ambassador to Indonesia and his wife, and by several filmmakers, scriptwriters, anthropologists, and a historian. Her remains were cremated while her estate was distributed to poor Indonesian children. Despite her services to the Indonesian Republic, she was omitted from most of the official Indonesian records of the independence struggle.

The Indonesian diplomat Suryono Darusman confirmed most of K'tut Tantri's account including her work as a broadcaster for the Voice of Free Indonesia and speechwriter for President Sukarno, and her voyage to Singapore and Australia to publicize the Indonesian republican cause. However, he noted that despite her contributions to the Indonesian nationalist cause, the Indonesians were uncomfortable with her unorthodox lifestyle and her exaggerated claims for attention. Singaporean historian Yong Mun Cheong also observed that the vituperative nature of her radio broadcasts in support of the Republican cause caused some embarrassment for the Indonesians. This led them to smuggle her out of Indonesia to Singapore in 1947, officially on the pretext that the Dutch would try to arrest her at the first opportunity. Despite years of support from Adam Malik and other veterans, her star faded among Indonesians in later years due to her wistful attitude towards the "glory days" of the revolution, her anachronistic praise for Sukarno, and her inability to pay hotel bills.

== Bibliography ==
- Anderson, Sarah (4 September 1997). "Obituary: K'tut Tantri". The Independent. United Kingdom.
- Darusman, Suryono (1992). Singapore and the Indonesian Revolution 1945-50: Recollections of Suryono Darusman. Singapore: Institute of Southeast Asian Studies. ISBN 981-3016-17-5.
- Lindsey, Timothy (1997). The romance of K'tut Tantri and Indonesia. Kuala Lumpur: Oxford University Press. ISBN 9789793780634.
- Tantri, K'tut (1960). Revolt in Paradise. London: William Heinemann.
- Witton, Ron (October–December 1997). "The romance of K'tut Tantri". Inside Indonesia. Archived from the original on 28 February 2014.
- Yong, Mun Cheong (2003). The Indonesian Revolution and the Singapore connection, 1945-1949. Singapore: Singapore University Press. ISBN 9971692767.
- Barley, Nigel (2017). Snow Over Surabaya. Singapore: Monsoon Books. ISBN 978-1912049004.
