= Indonesian People's Revolutionary Front =

Indonesian militia founded by Sutomo in 1945

Flag of the BPRI.

Indonesian People's Revolutionary Front (Indonesian: Barisan Pemberontakan Rakyat Indonesia), abbreviated as BPRI, was an Indonesian militia headquartered in Surabaya. It was founded by Sutomo on 12 October 1945.

== History ==
The Indonesian People's Rebellion was aimed at realizing and defending the Proclamation of Indonesian Independence. The term "revolutionary front" (Indonesian: barisan pemberontakan), and not "warrior front" (Indonesian: barisan pejuang), was chosen because since the Dutch held power over the local population, who were ordinary people, and wanted to emphasise the fact their militia was led first and foremost by the common man. BPRI rallied the people's resistance against the Dutch who wanted to reign Indonesia after the Surrender of Japan in World War II.

The most prominent role of BPRI was its involvement in the Battle of Surabaya. At that time, Sutomo delivered a speech through a radio broadcast that rallied the people in Surabaya against the army of Allied forces.

== Branches ==
BPRI had branches in Kalimantan, among others:

- BPRI expedition IX Banjarmasin under the leadership of Mohd. Asnawie and H. Arsyad;
- BPRI VIII Brig. "S" Div. VI (NAROTAMA) Samarinda under the leadership of RP Joewono.
