= Adhyaksa Dault =

Indonesian politician

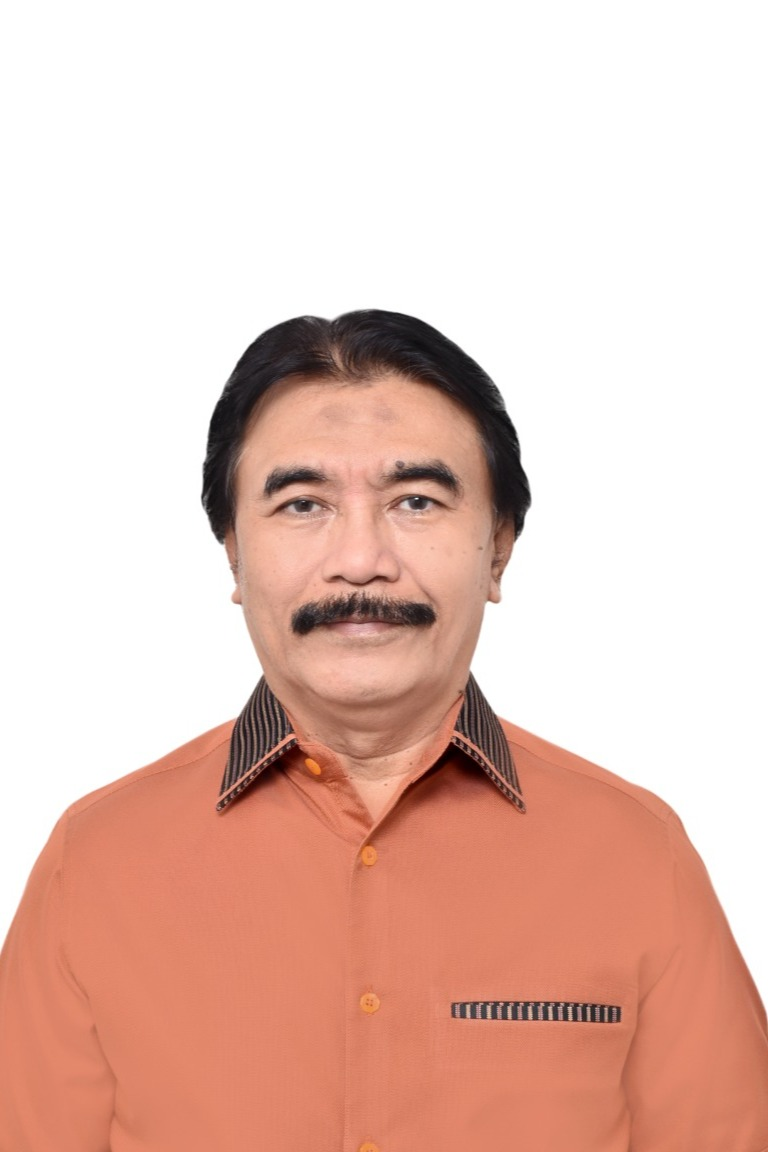

Chief Scout of the Pramuka Movement
- In office 5 December 2013 – 28 September 2018
- President: Susilo Bambang Yudhoyono; Joko Widodo
- Preceded by: Azrul Azwar
- Succeeded by: Budi Waseso

State Minister of Youth and Sports
- In office 21 October 2004 – 20 October 2009
- President: Susilo Bambang Yudhoyono
- Preceded by: Mahadi Sinambela (2000)
- Succeeded by: Andi Mallarangeng

Personal details
- Born: 7 June 1963 (age 63) Donggala, Indonesia
- Party: Nonpartisan
- Spouse: drg. Mirah Amiria Arismunandar
- Children: Umar Adiputra Adhyaksa; Fakhira Putri Maryam Adhyaksa
- Education: Universitas Trisakti; Universitas Indonesia; Institut Pertanian Bogor
- Website: https://adhyaksadault.info

Adhyaksa Dault (born 7 June 1963) served as the state minister of youth for sports in the United Indonesia Cabinet (2004–2009).

From 1987 to 1988, he served as the chair of the USAKTI Law Faculty Student Senate and the chair of the Jakarta Regional Corruption Student Senate (ISMAHI) Association. He served as chair of the Indonesian Institute of Justice and Democracy (LPKDI) from 1999 to 2002, and as chairman of the Indonesian Legal Counseling Association (IPHI) Jakarta from 1999 to 2004. Later he was also trusted to be the General Chair of the National Committee Indonesian Youth (KNP DPP) from 1999 to 2002. He served as general chair of the Indonesian Youth Assembly (MPI) from 2003 to 2006. In addition, he was also the chairman of the YPI Al Azhar Supervisory Board from 2007 to 2012.

On 27 August 2009, Dault, who was then a member of the House of Representatives from the Prosperous Justice Party who was confirmed elected from the electoral district Central Sulawesi, went to the office General Election Commission to submit a resignation as a prospective legislator.

After serving as minister of youth and sports, Dault returned to education at Program-Diponegoro University. Dault also served as chairperson of VANAPRASTHA, a forum for open nature activists and environmental activists which was established in 1976. Dault's program PIP3D (Promotion of Indonesia at - At the World Peak) combines various types of activities such as climbing expeditions, bicycle touring, talkshows and interactive dialogue while promoting Indonesian tourism abroad. In 2011, Dault and his team succeeded in carrying out climbing expeditions in Mont Blanc, touring bikes around parts of Western Europe and conducting interactive talk shows and dialogues in France and the Netherlands.

== Scouting ==
On 5 December 2013, Dault won the election chairman of Kwarnas Gerakan Pramuka Indonesia (Indonesian Scouting Movement National Quarter) for the 2013–2018 period at the National Conference (MUNAS) in Kupang, East Nusa Tenggara, replacing the late Azrul Azwar.
