= Ipindo =

Ikatan Pandu Indonesia
- Location: Jakarta
- Country: Indonesia
- Defunct: August 14, 1961
- chief commissioner: Tuan Soemardjo
- honorary President: Dr. Bahder Djohan
- Affiliation: World Organization of the Scout Movement 1953-1961

Ikatan Pandu Indonesia (Ipindo) was the World Organization of the Scout Movement-recognized Indonesian national Scouting federation from 1953 to 1961.

When Indonesia became an independent country, there were more than 60 separate Boy Scout and Girl Guide organizations. Most were directly affiliated with some certain political parties or social groups. And there was one national organization - the People's Scouts (Pandu Rakyat Indonesia), founded on 27–29 December 1945, just almost half a year since independence, in its 1st Congress in Surakarta. Attempts were made to unify all Scout organizations into one. The fact that Indonesia is made up of many islands made administration and supervision difficult, and the Japanese occupation caused some twenty separate Scout organizations to spring up, so it took time for them to coalesce. In September 1951, in a Jakarta conference, the People's Scouts, recognized by the Ministry of Education twice in 1947 and 1950 as the official Scout organization of the young nation, and the other 12 of the stronger Scout and Guide organizations nationwide met and decided to found a federating body to satisfy national and international needs. Representatives of these organizations decided that the time had come to merge into one national organization for Indonesian Scouting and Guiding. In the outcome, the decision was made to form a national organization: Ikatan Pandu Indonesia (Ipindo, Indonesian Scouting Union), on their basis.

Ipindo's motto was "Sedia", meaning "Be Prepared" in English. Tuan Soemardjo was elected chief commissioner, and Dr. Bahder Djohan, an old Scout and Minister of Education, became honorary President. Government approval of Ipindo was granted on February 22, 1952, and President Sukarno consented to become patron of the unifying and correlating National Scout Council. Ipindo became a member organization of the World Organization of the Scout Movement in 1953.

With the beginning of the Guided Democracy period came a period of unification of all Scout and Guide organizations into one singular national organization. On 9 March 1961, in the State Palace of Jakarta, in the presence of Ipinido representatives and those of other organizations, President Sukarno gave his blessing for the unification of Indonesian Scouting and Guiding into one national organization. With the April 1961 decision to merge the Fadjar Harapan (a pioneer movement founded in 1959) and other organizations into Ipindo, the establishment of a single Scout Movement organization in Indonesia called Gerakan Pramuka was officially completed.

On 20 May 1961, President Sukarno signed a presidential regulation formally declaring the new Gerakan Pramuka Indonesia as the official Scout and Guide organization in Indonesia and official heir and successor to the legacies of the former Scout and Guide organizations of the republic, inheriting thus Indonesia's membership in WOSM from Ipindo. On 30 July, at the Istora Gelora Bung Karno in Jakarta, the GPI was officially launched as the country's national co-ed Scouting and Guiding organization on the basis of the existing organizations in the republic, Ipindo included, with many of its Scoutmasters effectively carried over to the new organization.

Ipindo's official heraldic arms was the scouting trefoild with the national emblem Garuda Pancasila superimposed, the trefoil was in red, symbolic of the sacrifices of Scouting in the era of the National Revolution.
