= Bahder Djohan =

Indonesian politician (1902–1981)

Bahder Johan
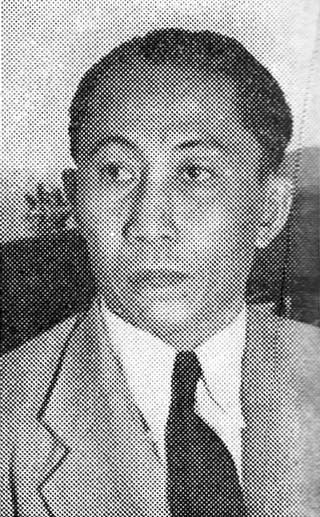
- Portrait, 1954

6th Minister of Education and Culture of Indonesia
- In office 6 September 1950 – 20 March 1951
- President: Sukarno
- Preceded by: Ki Sarmidi Mangunsarkoro
- Succeeded by: Wongsonegoro
- In office 3 April 1952 – 30 July 1953
- President: Sukarno
- Preceded by: Wongsonegoro
- Succeeded by: Mohammad Yamin

Personal details
- Born: 30 July 1902 Padang, Dutch East Indies
- Died: 8 March 1981 (aged 78) Jakarta, Indonesia
- Spouse: Siti Zairi
- Children: 1
- Education: STOVIA
- Occupation: Politician

Bahder Djohan (30 July 1902 – 8 March 1981) was an Indonesian politician who served as the 6th Minister of Education and Culture of Indonesia. He served in the Natsir and Wilopo Cabinets.

== Background ==
Bahder Djohan was the fifth of 10 children of Mohamad Rapal (Soetan Boerhanoedin) and Lisah. Bahder's father was a prosecutor. Bahder Djohan was styled Marah Besar when marrying Siti Zairi Yaman.

== Education ==
Bahder initially attended a Malay school in Kampung Pondok, Padang. In 1910, he followed his father to Payakumbuh. In 1913, Bahder attended 1e Klasse Inlandsche School (First Class Indies School) in Bukittinggi. There, he met Mohammad Hatta, later became his close friend. He only attended school in Bukittinggi for two years before moving to Hollands-Indische School (Dutch Indies School) in Padang. In 1917, Bahder completed his education in HIS and continued his education to Meer Uitgebreid Lager Onderwijs (junior high school) in the same city.

In 1919, Bahder attended STOVIA in Batavia (now Jakarta) for 8 years, and lived in a dormitory located in the faculty complex. On November 12, 1927, he graduated from STOVIA and received his medical degree.

== Career ==
In his youth, Bahder was one of Jong Sumatranen Bond's leader. He was actively involved in Youth Pledge. In the First Youth Pledge, Bahder delivered a speech about women's position. His speech "Di Tangan Wanita (In the Hand of Women) was banned by Dutch colonial government.

In the Independence era, Bahder was elected Minister of Education and Culture in Natsir (1950–1951) and Wilopo Cabinet (1952–1953). In 1953, he was appointed President of Central Hospital of Jakarta (now Cipto Mangunkusumo National Central Hospital). Then, he was elected Rector of University of Indonesia, however in 1958, before his term of office ended, Bahder resigned in February 1958 following his disagreement with Indonesian government suppressing Revolutionary Government of the Republic of Indonesia by means of war. He specifically resigned following the Indonesian Air Force's bombing of the town of Painan.

== Scouting ==
In September 1951 thirteen of the stronger Scouting organizations met and decided to found a federating body to satisfy national and international needs. Ikatan Pandu Indonesia – Ipindo for short – came into being. Tuan Soemardjo was elected chief commissioner, and Dr. Djohan, an old Scout, became honorary President.

== Bibliography ==
- Djohan, Bahder, Bahder Djohan Pengabdi Kemanusiaan, PT Gunung Agung, Jakarta, 1980
- Hatta, Mohammad, Mohammad Hatta Memoir, Tinta Mas Jakarta, 1979

== Footnotes ==
| Preceded by Sarmidi Mangunsarkoro | Minister of Education and Culture; 1950—1951 | Succeeded by Wongsonegoro |
| Preceded by Wongsonegoro | Minister of Education and Culture; 1952—1953 | Succeeded by Mohammad Yamin |
