= Satuan Karya =

Satuan Karya Pramuka (Saka) or special scout troops are the education tools, part of the Indonesian Scouting movement, to sharpen the Scouts' skills in certain fields, to build knowledge in the Information Technology (IT) field, and to answer the challenges from youth to provide advantageous activities. Satuan Karya troops are for youth age 14-25, with at least the Penggalang Terap rank, or for any person who is not a Scout, who can fulfill certain qualifications. Every troop has their own department, where each department concentrates on some special field or branch of science. In every Satuan Karya, there are special merit badges that can be obtained by fulfilling the requirements. There are nine such speciality units and these are open only to Scouts in the Rover ("Pramuka Penegak") and Venture Scout ("Pramuka Pandega") levels.

== Saka Wirakartika ==
Satuan Karya Pramuka Wirakartika is a special troop where scouts enrich their knowledge and skills for national military defense, civil defense and disaster response. It is affiliated with the Indonesian Army and the National Agency for Disaster Countermeasure. It is under supervision of the National Council and the aforementioned organizations. There are five subgroupings of Rovers and Venturers:

- Survival
- Pioneering
- Mountaineering
- Ground Navigation
- Disaster Management and Mitigation

== Saka Dirgantara ==
Satuan Karya Pramuka Dirgantara or Air Scout Troop is a special troop where the scouts sharpen their skills in aeronautical field. It is affiliated with the Indonesian Air Forces as well as the other aero clubs. It is under the supervision of both the National Council and Indonesian Air Force, together with the Ministry of Transportation. There are three subgroups:

- Aviation Sport
- Aviation Knowledge
- Air services and aviation health and safety

== Saka Bahari ==
Satuan Karya Pramuka Bahari or Sea and Maritime Scouts Troop is a special troop where the Scouts sharpen their skills in the maritime field . It is associated with the Indonesian Navy (including the Marine Corps), Ministry of Maritime Affairs and Fisheries, the Ministry of Transportation and other organizations that have connections with maritime activities. It is under the supervision of both the National Council and the Navy. These Scout troops only exist in places which have Maritime / River resources. The SKPB is organized into 4 sub groups:

- Maritime Resources and Marine Environmental Protection
- Maritime Transportation
- Maritime Tourism
- Maritime/Riverine safety and security issues

== Saka Bhayangkara ==
Satuan Karya Pramuka Bhayangkara or law enforcement Scouts Troop is a special troop deal with law enforcement in the community, assure the safety of and help law enforcement officers. The purpose is to sharpen their awareness against crime and prevent criminal activities in the community. Saka Bhayangkara is the biggest Special Scout Troop, and one of the most famous Satuan Karya. There are Satuan Karya Bhayangkara troops organized per local government unit. Saka Bhayangkara is under the supervision of National Council and in cooperation with the Indonesian National Police and the Municipal Police and Municipal Firefighters, under overall supervision of the Ministry of Home Affairs. There are four subgroups :

- Discipline enforcement
- Traffic Management
- Search and Rescue and Disaster risk management and prevention
- Crime Scene Management

== Saka Bhakti Husada ==
Satuan Karya Pramuka Bakti Husada or health service Scouts Troop is the special troop where the Scouts can sharpen their skills in Medical Assistance, Health, and disease awareness; providing the Scouts with the chance to get hands on experience in medical treatment and disease prevention as well as giving knowledge about diseases and the importance of a healthy lifestyle to the community. The training of Saka Bhakti Husada is under the National council in coordination with the Ministry of Health, the Regional Health Offices, Red Cross, Hospitals and other professional healthcare organizations. There are five subgroups in Saka Bhakti Husada :

- Healthy Environment Education
- Healthy Family Education
- Diseases Prevention and Education
- Protein and Vitamins Education
- Medicine Education

== Saka Kencana ==
Satuan Karya Pramuka Kencana is a troop that deals with the family problems such as educating the community about birth control, family wealth, and other daily problems that are faced by the community. The management and training of Saka Kencana is under the National Coordination Organization for Family Planning (Badan Koordinasi Keluarga Berencana Nasional /BKKBN) and the National Council. There are 4 subgroups (Krida) in Saka Kencana :

- Birth Control and Health Reproduction
- Family Wealth and Family Empowerment
- Education, Information, Communication and Advocation
- Community Empowerment

== Saka Taruna Bumi ==
Satuan Karya Pramuka Tarunabumi is a special troop where Scouts can learn about agriculture so that Scouts can contribute to agriculture development. Training and education for Saka Taruna bumi are under the supervision of the National Council and the Ministry of Agriculture. There are 5 subgroups (Krida) in Saka Taruna Bumi:

- Agriculture and food Produce Plants
- Agriculture and Plantation
- Fish farm
- Animal husbandry
- Horticultural Plants

== Saka Wanabhakti ==
Satuan Karya Pramuka Wanabakti or forest and natural resources preserve Special troop are the troops that deal with the preservation of forest and natural habitats inside the forest, take care of forests, reforestation, and protect the natural habitats and animals is part of Saka Wanabhakti daily job. It is under the supervision of the National Council and associated with Ranger (JAGAWANA) and other natural resource preservation law enforcement. There are 4 subgroups:

- Natural Resources Management
- Natural Resources Preserve
- Natural Resources Education
- Natural Resources Utilization

== Saka Pariwisata ==
The Saka Pariwisata or Tourism Scout Troop, under the supervision of the National Council, the Ministry of Tourism, National Police and Municipal Police are special Scout troops that promote the value of Indonesian tourism and maintain the tourist facilities and popular tourism attractions. It also entails for the care and preservation of these attractions. The following subgroups fall under this unit:

- Cultural tourism
- Tourism facilities guidance and training
- Tourism attractions guidance and training
- Tourist guide training

== Saka Puskata ==
The Saka Puskata or Literature Troop is a scout troop which is a forum for activities to increase practical knowledge and skills in the field of literature in order to raise awareness for individual dedication towards national development, as well as to raise the importance of reading to younger people. Falling under the National Council and in coordination with the Ministry of Education and Culture, the National Library and National Archives of Indonesia the Saka Puskata also serve as young ambassadors of Indonesian literature, which promote works both in Bahasa Indonesia and the country's regional languages. The first formation was raised in Central Java in 2007.

Under this formation are four subgroupings each handling the following aspects:

1. Basic and advanced library services
2. Deposit and issuance of books and other literary materials
3. Library Material Development
4. Library facilities development and maintenance

== Saka Millenial ==
The Saka Millenial (Millenial Generation Troop) is the youngest of the specialized formations, having been established by the Central Java Council in 2018 in celebration of 65 years of the nationalized scouting movement. One of two ICT-focused troops, it trains Rover and Venture-level scouts in skills related to digital technologies, social media, blogging, website creation, robotics and cyber security. The current Chief Scout, Budi Waseso, openly endorsed the provincial project, and it is aimed to be introduced to other councils.

5 subgroups fall under this grouping:

- Digital literacy and social media
- Multimedia and animation
- Cybersecurity
- Digital innovation
- Telemetrics and robotics

== Saka Telematika ==
The older Saka Telematika or Information and Communications Technology Troop, established in West Java in 2011 and falls under the supervision of the National Council and the Ministry of Communication and Information Technology with support from Telkom Indonesia and other telecommunications firms, is a specialised troop that trains Scouts in the wider world of information and communications technology. 4 categorized subgroups report under this formation:

- Telecommunications
- Information Technology
- Educational entertainment
- Media

== Saka Teknologi ==
The Saka Teknology or Technology Troop is another specialised formation, which aims to train and nurture Scouts in general technological education. It is the goal of this troop to help Scouts reach their potential in the fields of technological research and advances. It is supported by the Ministry of Research and Technology.

== See also ==
- Gerakan Pramuka Indonesia
