= Fadjar Harapan =

- Country: Indonesia
- Founded: 1959
- Defunct: 1961
- Founder: D.N. Aidit

Fadjar Harapan ('Dawn of Hope') was a short-lived Indonesian pioneer organization, linked to the Communist Party of Indonesia (PKI). Fadjar Harapan was founded in 1959, albeit that there already was an existing Scouting movement initiated by the Communist Party. However, the organization was officially not connected to any political party (according to the constitution of the organization) and was open to all children between the ages of six and thirteen. The initiative to found the new organization was taken by the party leader Aidit. Cadres of the Communist Party and Pemuda Rakjat (the youth wing of the Communist Party) were given the task to study how pioneer movements functioned in other countries, but adapting Fadjar Harapan to Indonesian conditions.

Once Fadjar Harapan was launched, it consisted of local organizations with no functioning national central organization. Fadjar Harapan groups were set up in different major cities around the country. In the capital Djakarta the movement had around a thousand members. Fadjar Harapan groups would arrange sport events, help school pupils with homework, provide agricultural and handicraft training, promote studies in revolutionary history and organize excursions to museums and sites of historical interest. Sumijati, a Fadjar Harapan representative, read out a declaration at the sixth congress of the Communist Party held in 1959.

Both Fadjar Harapan and the Communist Party-led Scouting movement were forcefully merged into Gerakan Pramuka Indonesia (with president Sukarno as its chief Scout) in 1961.
