= Ranks in Gerakan Pramuka Indonesia =

Rank and insignia system of Indonesian scouting

The rank insignia system of the Indonesian Scouting movement Gerakan Pramuka Indonesia is by and large militarized in traditions and outfit.

Much is left to the traditions of specific groups. Some of them do not grant some of the ranks to its members, while others name them differently; the very look of the insignia may differ from group to group.

== Merit badges ==
Tanda Kecakapan Khusus (TKK) are merit badge awards earned by youth members of the Gerakan Pramuka organization, based on activities within an area of study by completing Special Skills Requirements (SSR/SKK). Some special TKK are also required in order to achieve the Eagle Scout award. Members who have earned more than five merit badges display them on a sash which may be optionally worn diagonally across the front of the Boy Scout uniform from right side to left side. Sashes are usually only worn for ceremonial occasions.

=== Level ===
TKK for Boy Scout, and Rover Scout are divided into three levels:

- For the lowest level, called Purwa, merit badges are in the shape of a circle
- For the medium level, called Madya, merit badges are in the shape of a square
- For the highest level, called Utama, merit badges are in the shape of a pentagon

=== Group ===
Based on the background color, TKK can be divided into 5 groups where each color represents special areas of interest. The image of TKK represents the subject of interest. The pictures are standard from the National Council. For Cub Scout level there is only one level of TKK, and does not have as many choices of merit badge (Note: cub Scout Merit Badges showed above, which have a triangle shape).

- Group 1
  - Background Color: Yellow
  - Area of Interest: Religion
- Group 2
  - Background Color: Blue
  - Area of Interest: Social Service, Peace campaign, communication.
- Group 3
  - Background color: Green
  - Area of Interest: Special Abilities, Hobbies, Survival abilities.
- Group 4
  - Background color: White
  - Area of Interest: Physical Abilities
- Group 5
  - Background Color: Red
  - Area of Interest: Culture, Housekeeping, Music, Art .

== Rank insignia ==
=== Penggalang Ramu ===
Penggalang Ramu (Tenderfoot) is the official first level for those Scouts who are now part of the regular Junior Boy/Girl Scout level from being Cub Scouts. They wear a single chevron pointed down on the sleeve. Newly invested and promoted Scouts in their age group up from the Cub Scout program carry this rank. Eligibility requirement is having completed the basic skills required for entry in the age level.

=== Penggalang Rakit ===
Penggalang Rakit (Second Class) is the second level of the Junior Boy/Girl Scout level, and these Scouts who are in the rank wear two chevrons.

=== Penggalang Terap ===
Penggalang Terap (First Class) is the third and final level of the Junior Boy/Girl Scout level in the GPI, and these Scouts who are in the rank wear three chevrons in all orders of dress.

=== Calon Bantara ===
Bantara Cadet, Bantara, Penegak Laksana

Calon Bantara is a transition level between Boy Scout/Girl Scout and Rover Scout. In this level, a member learns the basics of Penegak level, also called Troop guest. This rank is bestowed to newly advanced Scouts who have entered the Rover program.

=== Penegak Bantara ===
Penegak Bantara is the first official level after a member obtains their orientation and transition from the Boy Scout/Girl Scout level towards Rover status. Bantara level can be obtained after completing the general basic skills for Penegak or Rover level in SKU (general requirement). The shoulder board for Bantara is almost the same as the Penegak Laksana. The difference is the word BANTARA written on it. The official welcome ceremony for a new Bantara, often called Upacara Adat Ambalan (customary law ceremony) involves a senior and instructor holding a campout for two nights. During this campout the individual cadet will be inducted as a Bantara and welcomed to the Rover level.

=== Penegak Laksana ===
Penegak Laksana is a level after Penegak Bantara in Penegak age group. A Scout can earn this level after they fulfill requirements from the Penegak/Rover Handbook. One can be easily identified as Penegak Laksana by the shoulder board on his/her uniform. The difference between the Bantara and Laksana shoulder board is the word written on it. The color and sign is the same between Bantara and Laksana. In Penegak group, the only shoulder loop that looks different is the CARA (Calon Bantara) or Bantara Cadet, where the logo is not the Tunas Kelapa (coconut sprout), but the kujang, an Indonesian traditional weapon, from West Java), and the word written: CARA (Calon Bantara) or Bantara Cadet.

=== Pramuka Pandega (Venturers) ===
The highest rank and age group of the GPI, the rank of Venturer Scout or Pramuka Pandega is achieved when formally entering a senior high school or university Scout troop and all the membership requirements have been completed for admission. Venturers wear two stars on the shoulder board above the GPI lesser emblem and upon their graduation and eventual departure from the GPI program proper, may have achieved any of the merit and speciality badges gained as Venturers.

=== Pramuka Garuda ===
Pramuka Garuda

Pramuka Garuda is the highest rank in each age group for Scouts in Gerakan Pramuka for those Scouts who can fulfill the qualifications. Garuda Scouts are expected to set an example for other Scouts. They are expected to become the leaders in life that they have demonstrated themselves to be in Scouting. Garuda is a mythical bird in many Asian countries.

Pramuka Garuda was created in 1980 with purpose of stimulating interest in youth to join Gerakan Pramuka. The Pramuka Garuda rank is based on the decree of Pramuka Garuda by the National Council No:045 for 1980. In 1984, the decree was revised, and replaced by the decree No:101 for 1984.

==== Requirements ====
A Scout who wants to earn the Garuda Scout rank has to be qualified for all requirements stated by National Council in the decree. The Garuda Scout requirement is different for each age group. For instance, the requirements for Garuda Scout in the Siaga/Cub Scouts level will differ from the requirements from Penegak (Rover Scout). When all are achieved, the Scout is thus eligible to become a Garuda Scout (age level regardless) and is entitled to wear a gold medal while keeping the insignia of his/her age group.

If acquired for any Scout from the Cub to Rover level if he or she is ready to advance to the next age level and has completed the advancement requisites and well as the requirements for nomination to the medal, he or she wears the Garuda Scout medal worn under his or her previous age grouping before advancing to the higher level above his or her current age group. If a Pandega or Venturer Scout earns the requirements for the medal before joining adult leaders course or leaving the program, he or she wears it in full dress alongside any merit badges achieved during his or her service term.

===== Requirements for Cub Scout =====
1. Be a good example at pack, home, school, or in his/her community, based on the Dwisatya (oath) and Dwidarma (pledge)
2. He/she has finished "siaga tata" (First Class Cub) rank requirements
3. Has earned the merit badge for cub level, at least he/she earned six badges from three different categories
4. Can demonstrate and show his/her handcrafts, at least nine different handcrafts made from at least three kinds of materials
5. Has participated in the Cub Scouts jamboree at least twice, either at the province or national level
6. Can prove himself/herself as a lifesaver
7. Can perform a kind of art, dance or other traditional fine art

===== Requirements for Scout =====
1. Be a good example in the troop, home, school, or in his/her community, based on the Trisatya (oath) and Dasadarma (pledge)
2. Achieved First Class (Penggalang Terap) rank with corresponding requirements
3. Earned the merit badges for Scout First Class, with a minimum of 10 merit badges in each of the three merit grades
4. Participated in regional and national level events of the GPI (Scout Jamborees, camping events, etc.), with a minimum of two events, may also be chosen for international appearances in regional or global events of the WOSM
5. Performed well in community service
6. Demonstrated sufficient and capable life-saving work
7. Demonstrated able work in cultural activities (either visual or performing)
8. Demonstrated athletic abilities on individual or team sports

===== Requirements for Rover Scout =====
1. Be a good example in the troop, home, school, or in his/her community, based on the Trisatya (Oath) and Dasadarma (Pledge)
2. Demonstrated respect and obedience to the Constitution and laws of the Republic
3. Achieved First Class (Penegak Laksana) rank with corresponding requirements
4. Earned the merit badges for Scout First Class, with a minimum of 10 merit badges in each of the three merit grades
5. Participated in regional and national level events of the GPI (Scout Jamborees, camping events, Rover Moots, etc.), as well as international events of the WOSM, either worldwide or regional
6. Performed better in community service
7. Has become active in his or her Satuan Karya unit
8. Demonstrated incredible life-saving work with additional skills learned as a Rover
9. Demonstrated able work in cultural activities (either visual or performing)
10. Demonstrated athletic abilities on individual or team sports

===== Requirements for Venturer Scout =====
1. Be a good example in the troop, home, university/college/institute, or in his/her community, based on the Trisatya (Oath) and Dasadarma (Pledge)
2. Demonstrated respect and obedience to the Constitution and laws of the Republic and has consistent support for the Guidelines of State Policy
3. Completes all requirements for the Venture level
4. Earnes any merit badges for the Venture level
5. Participates actively, as well as performing volunteering work, in regional and national level events of the GPI as well as international events of the WOSM, either worldwide or regional (Rover Moots, Jamborees, etc.).
6. Performed at his/her best in community service in all levels
7. Has become active in his or her Satuan Karya unit
8. Demonstrated extraordinary life-saving work with additional skills learned in the Venture level
9. Demonstrated able work in cultural activities (either visual or performing)
10. Demonstrated athletic abilities on individual or team sports
11. Has supported his or her local Regional scout council in the performance of their activities as specified by the GPI Charter
