= Revised Ampera Cabinet =

27th Indonesian cabinet 1967 to 1968

Revised Ampera Cabinet Kabinet Ampera Yang Disempurnakan
- 27th Cabinet of Indonesia
- 1967–1968
- Date formed: 14 October 1967
- Date dissolved: 6 June 1968

People and organisations
- Head of state: Suharto (acting president)
- Head of government: Suharto
- No. of ministers: 23 ministers
- Member party: ABRI PNI; Murba Party; Parkindo; Catholic Party of the Republic of Indonesia; NU Independent

History
- Predecessor: Ampera I Cabinet
- Successor: Development I Cabinet

The Revised Ampera Cabinet (Indonesian: Kabinet Ampera Yang Disempurnakan) was an Indonesian cabinet which served under Acting President Suharto from October 1967 until June 1968. In addition to the acting presidency, Suharto was also Minister of Defense and Security in this cabinet.

== Cabinet leader ==
President
Suharto (acting until 27 March 1968)

== Departmental Ministers ==
- Minister of Defense and Security: Gen. Suharto
- Minister of Home Affairs: Lt. Gen. Basuki Rahmat
- Minister of Foreign Affairs: Adam Malik
- Minister of Justice: Umar Seno Aji
- Minister of Information: B. M. Diah
- Minister of Education and Culture: Sanusi Hardjadinata
- Minister of Religious Affairs: Muhammad Dahlan
- Minister of Health: G. A. Siwabessy
- Minister of Manpower: Brig. Gen. Awaluddin Djamin
- Minister of Social Affairs: Albert Mangaratua Tambunan
- Minister of Finance: Frans Seda
- Minister of Trade: Maj. Gen. M Jusuf
- Minister of Agriculture: Maj. Gen. Sutjipto
- Minister of Plantations: Thayeb Hadiwidjaja
- Minister of Transportation: Air Commodore Sutopo
- Minister of Maritime Affairs: Rear Admiral Jatidjan
- Minister of Public Works: Sutami
- Minister of Basic Industries, Light Industries and Energy: Maj. Gen. Ashari Danudirdjo
- Minister of Textile and Handicraft Industries: Sanusi
- Minister of Mines: Sumantri Brodjonegoro
- Minister of Transmigration, Veteran Affairs and Mobilization: Lt. Gen. Sarbini

== State Ministers ==
- State Minister of Economics, Finance, and Industry: Hamengkubuwono IX
- State Minister of People's Welfare: Idham Chalid
