= Ampera Cabinet =

Indonesian Cabinet between 1966 and 1967

Ampera Cabinet Kabinet Ampera
- 26th Cabinet of Indonesia
- 1966–1967
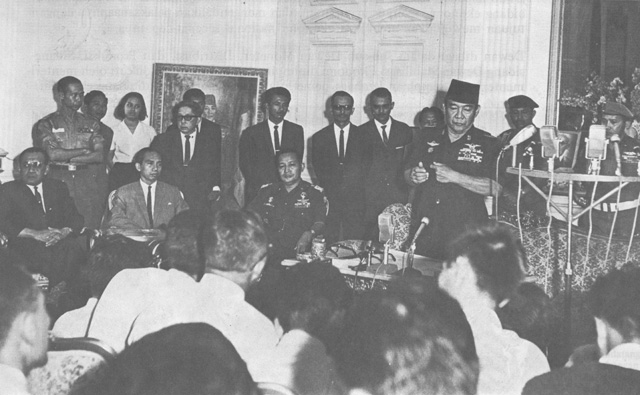
- Date formed: 28 July 1966
- Date dissolved: 11 October 1967

People and organisations
- Head of state: Sukarno (until 12 March 1967); Suharto (from 12 March 1967)
- Head of government: Suharto
- No. of ministers: 30 ministers
- Member party: ABRI; PNI; Murba Party; Parkindo; Catholic Party of the Republic of Indonesia; NU; Independent

History
- Predecessor: Dwikora III Cabinet
- Successor: Ampera II Cabinet

The Ampera Cabinet (Indonesian: Kabinet Ampera) was the Indonesian cabinet which served under President Sukarno and later on acting president Suharto from July 1966 until October 1967. The cabinet was formed after the Provisional People's Consultative Assembly (MPRS) session of 1966 which commissioned Suharto to form a new cabinet. Although Sukarno would not be removed from the presidency for some months, for all intents and purposes, the person who was truly in charge of the cabinet, and Indonesia by this point, was Suharto.

== Cabinet leader ==
President
Sukarno (deposed on 12 March 1967)
Suharto (acting from 12 March 1967)

== Cabinet Presidium ==
- Chairman/Chief Minister of Defense and Security/Commander of the Army: Lieutenant General Suharto
- Chief Minister of Political Affairs/Minister of Foreign Affairs: Adam Malik
- Chief Minister of People's Welfare: Idham Chalid
- Chief Minister of Economics and Finance: Hamengkubuwono IX
- Chief Minister of Industry and Development: Sanusi Hardjadinata

== Ministers in the Field of Defence and Security ==
- Commander of the Navy: Rear Admiral Muljadi
- Commander of the Air Force: Air Marshal Rusmin Nurjadin
- Chief of Police: Police General Sucipto Judodiharjo
- Minister of Veterans Affairs and Demobilisation: Major General Sarbini

== Ministers in the Field of Political Affairs ==
- Minister of Home Affairs: Major General Basuki Rahmat
- Minister of Justice: Umar Seno Adji
- Minister of Information: B. M. Diah

== Ministers in the Field of People's Welfare ==
- Minister of Education and Culture: Sarino Mangunpranoto
- Minister of Religious Affairs: Sjaifuddin Zuchri
- Minister of Social Affairs: Albert Mangaratua Tambunan
- Minister of Health: G. A. Siwabessy
- Minister of Manpower: Brigadier General Awaluddin Djamin

== Ministers in the Field of Economics and Finance ==
- Minister of Trade: Major General Ashari Danudirjo
- Minister of Finance: Frans Seda
- Minister of Transportation: Air Commodore Sutopo
- Minister of Maritime Affairs: Rear Admiral Jatidjan
- Minister of Agriculture: Brigadier General Sutjipto
- Minister of Plantations: P. C. Hardjasudirja

== Ministers in the Field of Industry and Development ==
- Minister of Basic Industries, Light Industries, and Energy: Major General M Jusuf
- Minister of Textile and Handicraft Industries: Sanusi
- Minister of Mines: Slamet Bratanata
- Minister of Public Works: Sutami

== Changes ==
- 12 March 1967: Sukarno was dismissed from the Presidency by the MPRS. He was replaced by Suharto who assumed the office of Acting President.
