= Maraden Panggabean =

Indonesian general (1922–2000)

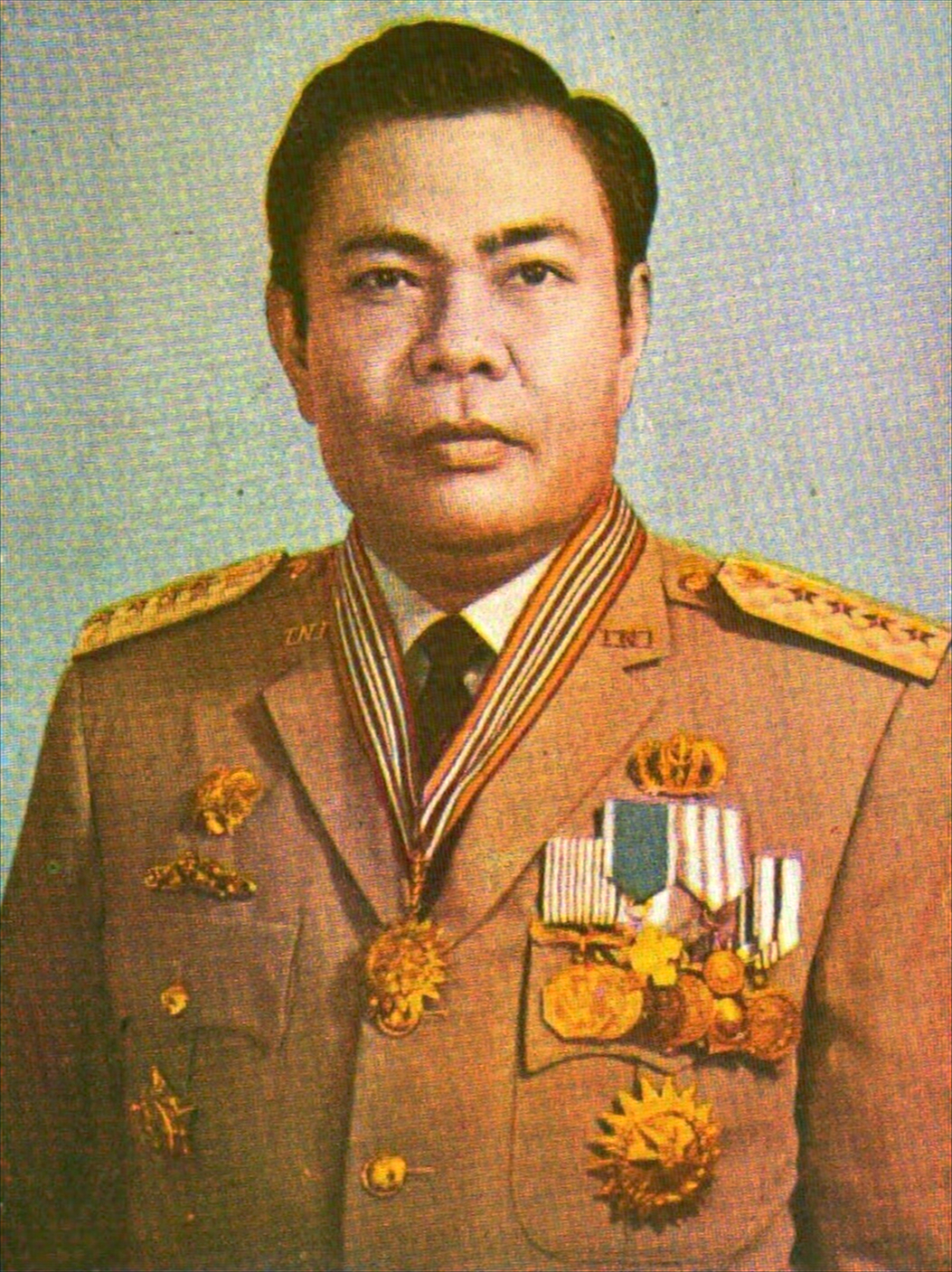
- Official portrait, c. 1971

8th Chairman of the Supreme Advisory Council
- In office 19 March 1983 – 23 March 1988
- President: Suharto
- Preceded by: Idham Chalid
- Succeeded by: Sudomo

1st Coordinating Minister for Political, Legal, and Security Affairs
- In office 29 March 1978 – 19 March 1983
- President: Suharto
- Preceded by: Position established
- Succeeded by: Surono Reksodimedjo

6th Commander of the Armed Forces of the Republic of Indonesia
- In office 28 March 1973 – 17 April 1978
- President: Suharto
- Preceded by: General Suharto
- Succeeded by: General Mohammad Jusuf

14th Minister of Defense and Security
- In office 9 September 1971 – 29 March 1978
- President: Suharto
- Preceded by: Suharto
- Succeeded by: Mohammad Jusuf

2nd Commander of Kopkamtib
- In office 19 November 1969 – 27 March 1973
- President: Suharto
- Preceded by: General Suharto
- Succeeded by: General Sumitro

8th Chief of Staff of the Indonesian Army
- In office 1 May 1968 – 25 November 1969
- President: Suharto
- Preceded by: General Suharto
- Succeeded by: General Umar Wirahadikusumah

Personal details
- Born: Maraden Saur Halomoan Panggabean; 29 June 1922 Tapanoeli, Dutch East Indies
- Died: 28 May 2000 (aged 77) Jakarta, Indonesia
- Party: Golkar
- Spouse: Meida Saimima Tambunan (m. 1950)
- Occupation: Army officer; politician

Military service
- Allegiance: Empire of Japan; Indonesia
- Branch/service: Defenders of the Homeland; Indonesian Army
- Years of service: 1943–1978
- Unit: Infantry
- Commands: Indonesian Army; Kopkamtib; Indonesian Armed Forces
- Battles/wars: Indonesian National Revolution; Operation Dwikora; Operation Lotus
- Service no.: 12150

Maraden Saur Halomoan Panggabean (29 June 1922 – 28 May 2000) was a prominent Indonesian general during the early years of General Suharto's New Order regime.

== Early life ==
Panggabean was born in Tarutung, North Sumatra, on 29 June 1922. He was from the Batak ethnic group.

After completing his education, Panggabean took on work as a teacher, an occupation held in high regard in the Batak community, and even became the principal of a school in Tarutung. In 1942, with the arrival and subsequent occupation of Indonesia by the Japanese Imperial Army, Panggabean left the field of education. He first trained to become a civil servant under the Japanese Occupational Government although he would soon be interested in taking on a military career.

== Military career ==
In 1943, the Japanese Occupation Government formed the Defenders of the Homeland Army an auxiliary force consisting of Indonesians which were designed to assist the Japanese should the Allies come to invade Indonesia. Like many of his military contemporaries, Panggabean joined. In Panggabean's case however, he seemed to have only manage to go through military schooling and basic training before the Japanese surrendered and nationalist leaders Sukarno and Mohammad Hatta proclaimed Indonesia's independence.

Like all other youths all around Indonesia, Panggabean was caught up in the rush to take weapons from the Japanese in preparation of the formation of a National Army. On 5 October 1945, the People's Security Army, the precursor to the Indonesian National Armed Forces and later on, TNI was formed. Panggabean took up the position of military trainer at Sibolga before serving as Chief of Staff for the 1st Battalion, 4th Regiment, 10th Division in Sumatra until 1949.

Following the Indonesian National Revolution of 1945–1950, Panggabean spent the next 10 years as a regimental chief of staff at Tapanuli and as a sectoral commander in the Military Territory of North Sumatra. In 1957, Panggabean also took the opportunity for further military education at the Infantry Officers Advanced Course in the United States. In 1959, Panggabean became battalion commander before being transferred to Military Territory II/Sriwijaya as resort commander.

Panggabean then received his first assignment out of Sumatra as a military court judge in Makassar, Sulawesi. As the Indonesia-Malaysia confrontation intensified, Panggabean was appointed commander of the 2nd War Theater, with authority over the troops in Borneo. There, he developed a friendship with Suharto as the then Kostrad commander had troops stationed in Borneo.

After he cracked down on the 30 September Movement, Suharto became the Commander of the Army. Suharto seemed to have remembered Panggabean and appointed him as a staff member with the position of second deputy.

== Supersemar controversy ==
Although originally not part of the events that led to the formulation of Supersemar and Suharto receiving executive power, Panggabean became part of the controversy in 1998. According to Sukardjo Wilardjito, a presidential bodyguard stationed at Bogor, Panggabean was present with Amir Machmud, Mohammad Jusuf, and Basuki Rahmat, the three generals that many accounts agree to have been present when Supersemar was signed. According to Sukardjo, Panggabean, alongside Basuki held Sukarno at gunpoint while he signed a pre-prepared Supersemar.

== New Order ==
=== Military career during New Order ===
In July 1966, the position of Deputy Army Commander was created and Panggabean was appointed to the position to assist Suharto with his increasing workload. In 1967, Panggabean became Army Commander himself. As Army Commander, Panggabean witnessed a reorganization in the Indonesian National Armed Forces which saw the armed services commanders be reduced in status to chief of staff under the control of an Army commander, a position to be filled by Suharto himself. In 1969, Panggabean became the Commander of Kopkamtib. Two years later, in 1971, Suharto reshuffled the Cabinet and Panggabean became Deputy Commander in addition to becoming State Minister assisting the President in matters of Defense and Security.

Panggabean reached the pinnacle of his military career in 1973 when he became Commander of the Indonesian National Armed Forces in addition to becoming Minister of Defense and Security. As Commander, Panggabean had differences with Minister of Foreign Affairs Adam Malik in the way in which Indonesia should approach its foreign policy in Southeast Asia. Malik wanted ASEAN to only be about economic cooperation whilst Panggabean wanted ASEAN to also be about security cooperation. In addition, Panggabean also wanted to send troops to assist the South Vietnamese in the Vietnam War. On this matter, Suharto sided with Malik.

In April 1978, Panggabean was discharged as Commander of the Indonesian National Armed Forces and Minister of Defense and Security.

=== Golkar ===
In addition to continuing his military career, Panggabean also began a political career by being involved in Golkar, the political party that Suharto had chosen as part of his re-election bid. In 1973, Panggabean became a member of the Golkar Executive Board before becoming Chairman of the Executive Board in 1974. He served in this position until 1978 when Suharto replaced him in the position. Nevertheless, Panggabean was retained as vice chairman of the executive board and served as the day-to-day chairman until 1988.

=== Government official ===
After being discharged as commander, Panggabean was named by Suharto as the Coordinating Minister of Politics and Security. He served as Minister until 1983 when he was appointed Chairman of the Supreme Advisory Council. When his term ended in 1988, Panggabean retired from politics.

=== Other activities ===
In 1985, Panggabean became Advisory Chairman for the Joint Organization of Batak Tradition and Culture. In 1989, he became a Patron of the Bona Pasogit Foundation, an organization dealing with the rehabilitation of earthquake-affected areas in Panggabean's native Tarutung.

== Death ==
Panggabean died in Jakarta on 22 May 2000 after suffering from a stroke.

== Personal Life ==
Panggabean was married to Meida Seimima Tambunan with whom he had four children, one son and three daughters.

He was of Batak ethnicity and was a Protestant.

== Honours ==
=== National honours ===
- Star of the Republic of Indonesia, 2nd Class (Indonesian: Bintang Republik Indonesia Adipradana) (10 March 1973)
- Star of Mahaputera, 2nd Class (Indonesian: Bintang Mahaputera Adipradana) (17 July 1970)
- Military Distinguished Service Star (Indonesian: Bintang Dharma)
- Guerrilla Star (Indonesian: Bintang Gerilya)
- Star of Yudha Dharma, 1st Class (Indonesian: Bintang Yudha Dharma Utama)
- Star of Kartika Eka Paksi, 1st Class (Indonesian: Bintang Kartika Eka Paksi Utama)
- Star of Jalasena, 1st Class (Indonesian: Bintang Jalasena Utama)
- Star of Swa Bhuwana Paksa, 1st Class (Indonesian: Bintang Swa Bhuwana Paksa Utama)
- Star of Bhayangkara, 1st Class (Indonesian: Bintang Bhayangkara Utama)
- Indonesian Armed Forces "8 Years" Service Star (Indonesian: Bintang Sewindu Angkatan Perang Republik Indonesia)
- Military Long Service Medal, 24 Years Service (Indonesian: Satyalancana Kesetiaan XXIV Tahun)
- 1st Independence War Medal (Indonesian: Satyalancana Perang Kemerdekaan I)
- 2nd Independence War Medal (Indonesian: Satyalancana Perang Kemerdekaan II)
- Military Operational Service Medal for Sulawesi 1958 (Indonesian: Satyalancana G.O.M IV)
- "Sapta Marga" Medal (Indonesian: Satyalancana Sapta Marga)
- Military Service Medal for Irian Jaya 1962 (Indonesian: Satyalancana Satya Dharma)
- Northern Borneo Military Campaign Medal (Indonesian: Satyalancana Wira Dharma)
- Medal for Combat Against Communists (Indonesian: Satyalancana Penegak)

=== Foreign honours ===
- Malaysia:
  - Honorary Grand Commander of the Order of Loyalty to the Crown of Malaysia (SSM) - Tun (1971)
- Netherlands:
  - Knight-Grand Cross of the Order of Orange-Nassau with Swords (1971)
- Philippines:
  - Grand Cross (Datu) of the Order of Sikatuna (1972)
- Thailand:
  - Knight Grand Cross of the Most Exalted Order of the White Elephant
- United States:
  - Commander of the Legion of Merit

== Notes ==
- Indonesian Army Bureau of History (1981), Sejarah TNI-AD 1945—1973: Riwayat Hidup Singkat Pimpinan Tentara Nasional Indonesia Angkatan Darat, vol. XIII

Political offices
New title	Coordinating Minister for Political and Security Affairs; 1978–1983	Succeeded by Surono Reksodimejo
Preceded by Suharto	Minister of Defense and Security; 1971–1978	Succeeded by Mohammad Jusuf
Military offices
Preceded by Suharto	Commander of the Indonesian Armed Forces; 1973–1978	Succeeded by Mohammad Jusuf
Preceded by Suharto	Commander of Kopkamtib; 1969–1973	Succeeded by Sumitro
Preceded by Suharto	Chief of Staff of the Indonesian Army; 1967–1969	Succeeded by Umar Wirahadikusumah
New title	Deputy Chief of Staff of Indonesian Army; 1966–1967	Succeeded by Umar Wirahadikusumah
Government offices
Preceded by Idham Chalid	Chairman of the Supreme Advisory Council; 1983–1988	Succeeded by Sudomo
Party political offices
Unknown	Vice Chairman of the Golkar Executive Board; 1978–1988	Unknown
Unknown	Chairman of the Golkar Executive Board; 1974–1978	Succeeded by Suharto
