= Suara Katolik =

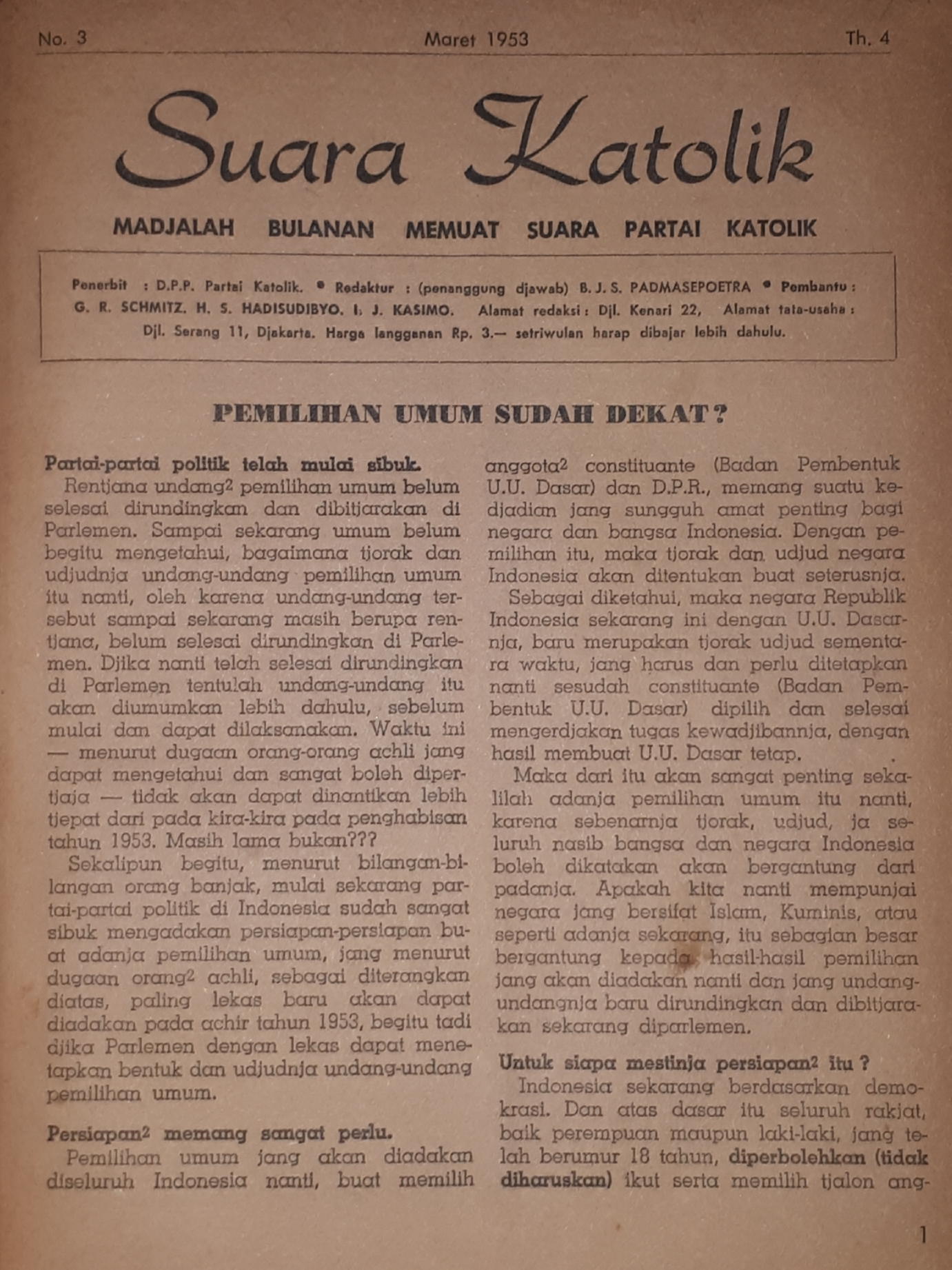
- The front page of Suara Katolik in March 1953
- Type: Quarterly newspaper
- Format: Compact
- Publisher: Central Executive Council of the Catholic Party
- Editor-in-chief: B.J.S Padmasepoetra
- Associate editor: G. R. Schmitz; H. S. Hadisudibyo; I.J.Kasimo
- Founded: 1924 (as the mouthpiece of PPKD); January 1, 1950; 76 years ago (as the mouthpiece of Catholic Party)
- Ceased publication: 1942
- Language: Indonesian

In Indonesia, Suara Katolik (English: Catholic Voice) is the official newspaper of the Catholic Party in Indonesia.

It was first published on 1924, as the mouthpiece of the Javan Catholic Political Union (PPKD). The newspaper focused on social affairs. The newspaper ceased publishing following the occupation of the Japanese. The newspaper began was restarted on 1 January 1950, a few years after the establishment of the Catholic Party. The newspaper was organized by the Central Executive Council of the Catholic Party.

== Bibliography ==
- Pringgodigdo, Agustinus (1 January 1991), Ensiklopedi Umum [General Encyclopedia] (in Indonesian), Jakarta: Kanisius, ISBN 9789794135228
- Muljana, Slamet (2008), Kesadaran Nasional: Dari Kolonialisme Sampai Kemerdekaan [National Consciousness: From Colonialism To Independence] (in Indonesian), vol. 1, Jakarta: Lkis Pelangi Aksara, ISBN 9789796871391
- Kasimo Foundation (1989), Sekilas peranan awam Katolik Indonesia dalam bidang kenegaraan (in Indonesian), Jakarta: The Foundation
