= Atma Jaya Catholic University of Indonesia =

Indonesian university

- Universitas Katolik Indonesia Atma Jaya
- Motto: Tepercaya Kualitas Lulusannya (Indonesian)
- Motto in English: Trustworthy Graduates' Quality
- Type: Private university
- Established: 1 June 1960; 66 years ago
- Rector: Prof. Dr. dr. Yuda Turana, Sp.S(K).
- Students: 12,238
- Location: Jakarta metropolitan area, Indonesia
- Campus: 3 urban campuses: Main: *Semanggi Campus Satellite: *Pluit Campus in North Jakarta *BSD Campus in Tangerang, Banten
- Colors: Orange
- Website: www.atmajaya.ac.id

Atma Jaya Catholic University of Indonesia (Indonesian: Universitas Katolik Indonesia Atma Jaya, abbreviated as Unika Atma Jaya), also known as Atma Jaya University or Atma Jaya, is an institute of higher learning in Jakarta, Indonesia, which was founded by the Atma Jaya Foundation on 1 June 1960. Atma Jaya has three campuses in Jakarta metropolitan area, in which the main campus is located in Semanggi, South Jakarta. The second campus, the center for health development, is located in Pluit, North Jakarta, next to its teaching hospital, Atma Jaya Hospital. The new campus is located in Tangerang, Banten (also called BSD Campus), and is planned to be the main campus for undergraduate students.

According to a survey by GlobeAsia Magazine in 2008 Atma Jaya was ranked third among all private universities in Indonesia. The survey of Tempo magazine from 2005 to 2007 put Atma Jaya in the top ten best universities in Indonesia. The General Directorate of Higher Education categorizes Atma Jaya in 50 Promising Indonesian Universities out of 2864 higher education institutions in Indonesia.

Since 2008, Atma Jaya has been increasing the number of undergraduate and graduate programs, and is constructing a new campus in Bumi Serpong Damai, Tangerang.

The university has been visited once by a reigning pope. Pope John Paul II visited on 12 October 1989. One of its main buildings was named after Pope John Paul II's original name, Karol Wojtyła.

== History ==
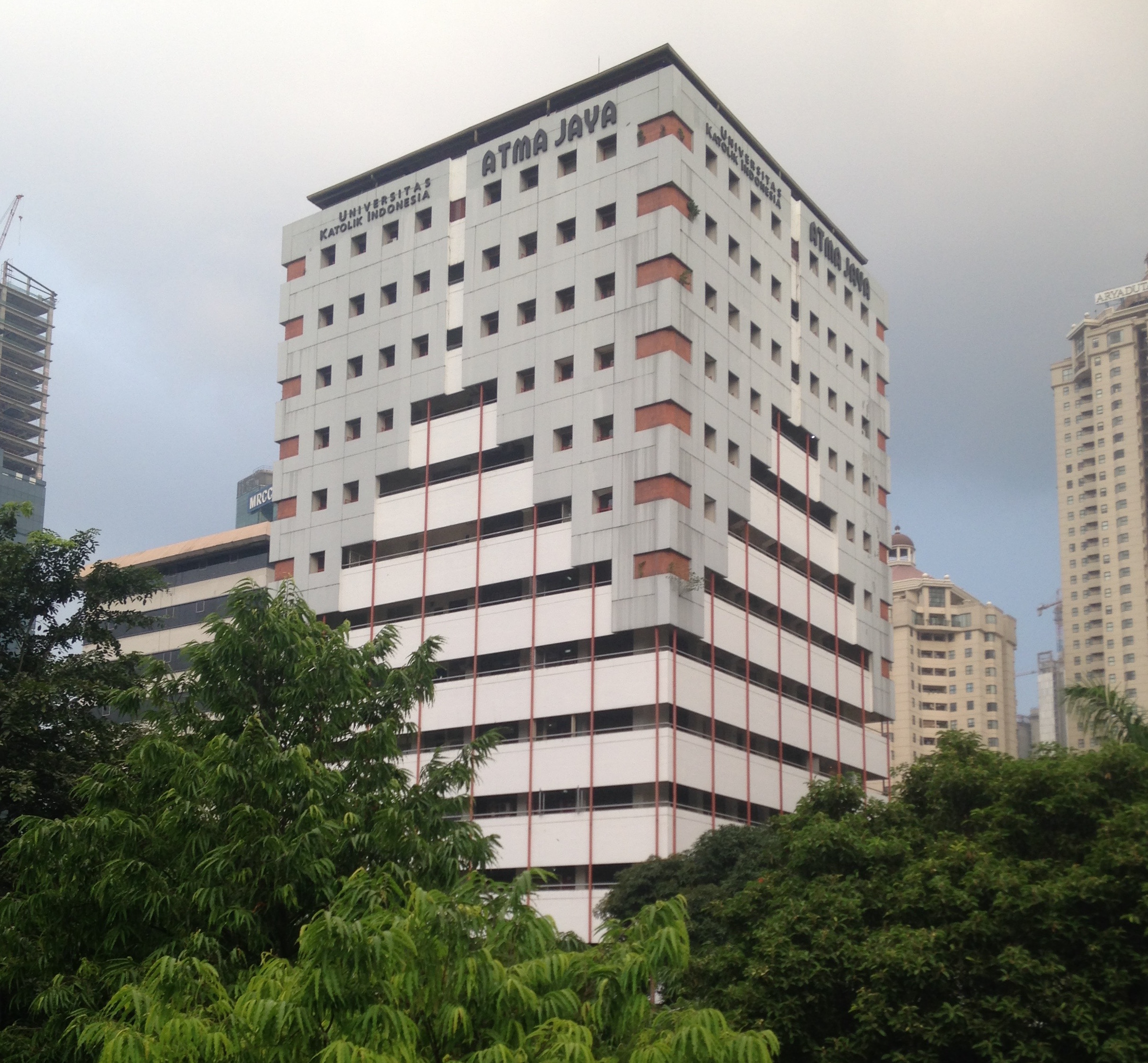
Semanggi campus

In June 1952, the bishops at an all-Java Bishops Meeting first dreamed of founding a Catholic institution of higher learning. The inspiration took form on 1 June 1960 with the establishment of the Atma Jaya Foundation. This institution later founded Atma Jaya Catholic University. Among the first founders were Ir. J.P. Cho, Ir. Lo Siang Hien-Ginting, Drs. Goei Tjong Tik, I.J. Kasimo, J.B. Legiman S.H, Drs. F.X. Frans Seda, Pang Lay Kim, Tan Bian Seng, Anton M. Moeliono, St. Munadjat Danusaputro, J.E. Tan, Ben Mang Reng Say, and Dr. Tjiook Tiauw Hie.

During its early years, the Ursuline Sisters helped Atma Jaya by providing classrooms at their school complexes in Lapangan Banteng Utara and at Santa Theresia, Menteng. Since 1967, Atma Jaya gradually moved to the campus at Jalan Jendral Sudirman, now known as the Semanggi Campus, and then to the Pluit Campus in North Jakarta which houses the Faculty of Medicine, Atma Jaya Hospital and the Atma Jaya Mortuary.

The faculties of Economics and Business Administration were founded in 1960, the faculties of Education and Engineering in 1961, the Faculty of Law in 1965, the Faculty of Medicine in 1967, the Faculty of Psychology in 1992, the master's degree program for professional psychologists in 2005, and the Faculty of Biotechnology in 2002.

Today, Atma Jaya Catholic University has eight faculties with 17 programs for the undergraduate/bachelor's degree. The postgraduate programs consist of three programs for master's degrees: a Master of Management, Master of Applied English Linguistics in 1992, and a master's degree program for professional psychologists in 2005. There is one program for a doctoral degree in applied English linguistics that started in 2002.

=== Name ===
Atma Jaya means the reign of the Spirit. The reign of the Spirit motivates the school to always increase education quality.

== Faculties ==
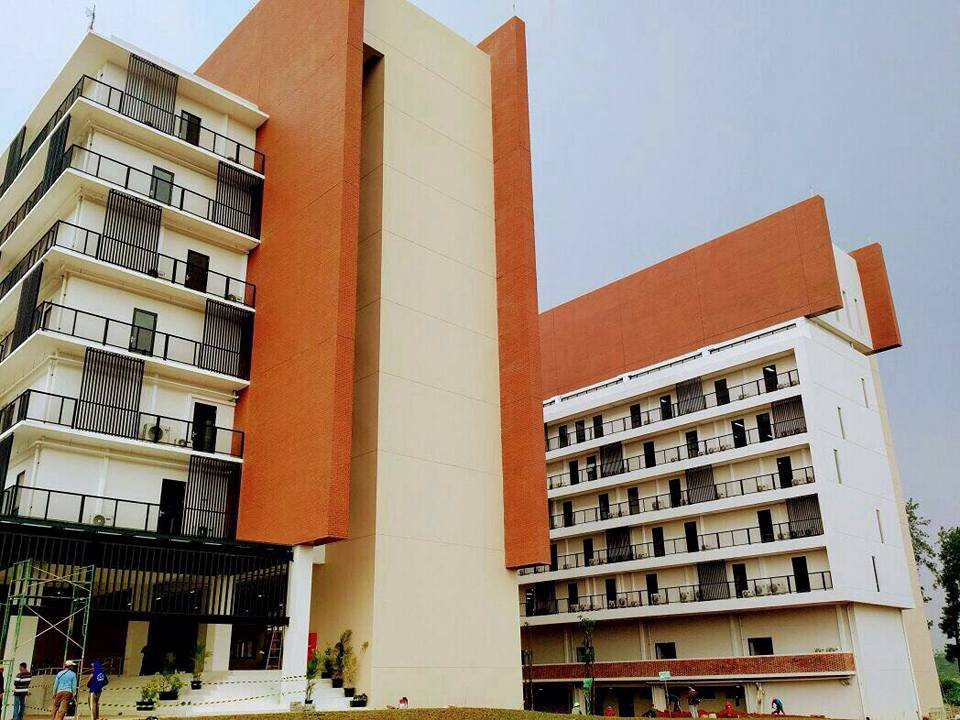
BSD campus

=== Economics & Business ===
The Faculty of Economics was founded on July 11, 1960, is the oldest faculty at Unika Atma Jaya. Initially, this faculty had one department, the Management Department, with Corporate Economics as the study program; in 1974, the Accounting Department was opened; and in 1992, the Economics and Development Study (IESP) opened.

The Faculty of Economics changed its name to the Faculty of Economics & Business in 2013.

=== Administration Studies ===
The Faculty of Administration Science (FIA) was a division of the Social and Political Sciences Faculty established on July 11, 1960. This faculty opened the General and Personnel Management Department.

The Bachelor of Arts level of this department obtained the "acknowledged" status based on a Decree of the Minister of University and Science of the Republic of Indonesia in 1964. The status was elevated to "equalized" in 1966. The full graduate level of the General and Personnel Management of the Social and Political Sciences Faculty in 1965.{?}

In 1970, the name of the Social and Political Sciences Faculty became the Faculty of Social Sciences Faculty whose full graduate level obtained "equalized" status based on the Decree of the Minister of Education and Culture of the Republic of Indonesia in 1980.

The Faculty of Administration Science with the Commercial Administration Study Program is the new name used since 1985 based on the Decree dated 1985. Along with the legalization of the name, the curriculum of the faculty was developed based on the core curriculum set forth by the Department of Education and Culture. The Administration Science Faculty – FIA Study Program – Commercial Administration Study Program are accredited as "A" based on the Decree of BAN-PT of the Department of Education and Culture in 1998. The accreditation rank has been retained with the obtainment of an "A" rank certificate (very good) based on the Decree of BAN-PT of the Department of Education and Culture in 2003.

In 2009, The Faculty of Administration Science opens a new study program. Programs of Study Communication Science, according to SK DITJEN DIKTI DEPDIKNAS No.887/D/T/2009 dated on June 11, 2009, has been legally administering its students admission. A year after the programs of Study Communication Science opened, The Faculty of Administration Science opened a programs of Hospitality. According to SK DITJEN DIKTI DEPDIKNAS No.78/D/O/2010 dated on June 9, 2010, programs of Hospitality is able to start admission process of admission for the next term.

The Faculty of Administration Science changed its name to the Faculty of Business Administration and Communication. FIABIKOM has three programs of study: Commercial Administration, Communication Science, and Hospitality. According to DIKTI's new regulations on academic degrees, programs of study Commercial Administration when completed will be granted Bachelor of Commercial Administration (Sarjana Administrasi Bisnis, S.AB.), Communication Science will be granted Bachelor of Communications (Sarjana Ilmu Komunikasi, S.I.Kom.), Hospitality will be granted Bachelor of Hospitality (Sarjana Pariwisata, S.Par.).

In late 2014, though not yet published and confirmed publicly, the Faculty of Business Administration and Communication would be merged with the Faculty of Economy. Merging these faculties would give birth to The Faculty of Economics and Business. The planned Faculty of Economics and Business was intended to have finished integrating for the new study term of 2015.

=== Education and Teaching ===
The Faculty of Teacher Training and Pedagogical Sciences (FKIP) was founded in 1961 as the continuation of the B1 Bonaventura course with three departments: the Pedagogical Science Department, English Language Department, and History Department. Four years later, on August 12, 1965, the name of this faculty changed to the Faculty of Pedagogical Science Faculty with two departments: the English Language Department and General Science Department. Since 1980, this faculty has been known as the Faculty of Teacher Training and Pedagogical Sciences.

The General Science Department changed into the Pedagogical Science Department with Pedagogical and Counseling Psychology study program while the English Language Department changed into the Language and Art Education Department of the English Language study program in 1985. For academic year 1985/1986, a new study program opened, Catechetic Education, which on November 18, 1996, changed to the Theological Pedagogical Science Study Program. This study program continued from the Catechetic Academy "Karya Wacana". At the time of establishment, FKIP had 280 registered students. In 1999, 1,350 students were registered in this program.

=== Engineering Faculty ===
==== History ====
When first founded the university had only the social faculty. The government regulated that a university must have both social and science faculties. Atma Jaya Catholic University of Indonesia opened a Faculty of Technology with the Mechanical Engineering department.

The founders were Ir. J. P. Cho and Ir. Bian Tamin (Tan Bian Seng). Cho got his title from the Technische Hogeschool Delft in Netherlands in 1955. He was a mechanical engineer.

A year after the establishment of Unika Atma Jaya, he and Ir. Bian Tamin founded the Faculty of Technology. At the opening of the Faculty of Technology, besides being a member of the foundation, he sat as the secretary of the faculty and a lecturer. Over 1968-1969, he was posted as the dean. During his office as the dean, with very limited financial resource and facility, he continued to raise the Faculty of Technology. Cho left the faculty membership with the foundation. (Since 1977 he has been a full-time Executive Secretary to the Atma Jaya Foundation. For his contributions to the world of education and Atma Jaya Catholic University of Indonesia in particular, on November 23, 1989, Pope John Paul II granted the Sancto Silvester medal to him.)

Ir. Bian Tamin. He moved to Bandung to attend to the Technische Hogeschool – Scheikundige Afdeling (Chemistry Department). He then left for the Netherlands and entered the Technische Hogeschool Delft Afdeling: Scheikundige Technologie. In the Netherlands, he co-founded IMKI. For his active contributions, he was promoted the president of IMKI. He was also a top member of PPI Management.

The Faculty of Technology was officially founded on July 1, 1961. In the early days, the Faculty of Technology only had the Mechanical Engineering Department. Lectures were given from one place to another.

In the beginning, there were no full-time staff. The staff were all part-timers and mostly members of the Marine Corps. They were there thanks to the close personal relationship with Ir. J. P. Cho. Among those giving lectures at the Faculty of Technology were Officer Dr. A.J. Suryadi, Dr. Parapat, Ir. Legiyono, Ir. Sugiyono Kadarisma, Ir. Ghandawinata, Ir. H.J. Kusumadiantho, Drs. Koeswono, and Dra. Saodhah.

There were 72 students. In 1989, there were 394 registered students in the Mechanical Engineering Department, mostly male.

The name of the Faculty of Technology changed in 1967 into the Faculty of Engineering (henceforth FT) based on the decree of the Ministry of Education and Culture. Since 1980, FT had been holding lectures in the campus complex in Jenderal Sudirman Street. Students participated in the construction of the semi-permanent buildings. As more and more students were admitted the need for classrooms increased. In 1985, some of the old semi-permanent buildings were demolished and replaced by a new three-story building known as Building K1.

The Engineering Faculty had a permanent lecturing facility in Jenderal Sudirman Street. There was no laboratory and students relied on Budi Utomo Technical Vocational High School, Manggarai Railway, and ITB'S shops. Later, given the importance of the laboratory to improve students' skills, those academic facilities were built. In 1985, the Engineering Faculty had had a Physical Laboratory, Mechanical Technology, Mechanical Drawing Studio, Mechanical Testing Laboratory, and Electronics and Telecommunication Laboratory.

The Graduate and Bachelor of Arts of the Mechanical Department were given a "registered" status in 1962. An approach was made to the Engineering Faculty of Indonesia University to found a Test and Supervision Team. It was only on July 27, 1985, that the Engineering Faculty was granted an "acknowledged" status. In 1971 that the Engineering Faculty graduated its students for the first time. There were four graduates.

On June 1, 1979, the Electronics Engineering Department opened. The opening of the department was in accordance with the Five Year Development Master Plan of Atma Jaya 1976-1981 which, among others contained a plan to open a new department at the Engineering Faculty. This department supports the Mechanical Engineering Department and in the future the establishment of the Industrial Engineering Department.

To manage the Electronics Engineering Department, a team which would work over two academic years was formed. This team consisted of five members: Dipl. Ing. Nakoela Soenarta, Ir. Legijono, Ir. Bambang Wirawan, Ir. Masgunarto Budiman, and Ir. M.J. Djoko Setyardjo. The head of the Electronics Engineering Department was Dipl. Ing. Nakoela Soenarto.

The Electronics Engineering Department got a "registered" status soon after the establishment. In 1988, the Electronics Engineering Department was granted an "acknowledged" status. Unlike the Mechanical Engineering Department, the Electronics Engineering Department born in the midst of the strong demand from society, did not encounter hurdles like the Mechanical Engineering did. The main issue was to recruit full-time lecturers. This was dealt by hiring part-time lecturers. At the same time, the attempt to hire full-time lecturers continued.

The population of students to the Electronics Engineering Department increased over years. There were 69 students in the first class. In the odd semester of 2004/2005, there were 744 registered students. In 1985, 3 of 289 students graduated; in 1987, 22 students graduated of 341; in 1988, 81 of 380; and in 1989, 35 of 433 students. This is a promising improvement.

The Industrial Engineering Department opened in academic year 1999/2000 based on the Decree of the Directorate General of University Education Number 49/DIKTI/Kep/1999 dated March 3, 1999, under "registered" status.

Laboratories specific to the Industrial Engineering Department were built one at a time. First, the Statistics and Decision Support Laboratory has been built and the next will be the Working System Designing and Ergonomics and Production System laboratories. The Industrial Engineering Department was founded under Dean Ir. Joseph Sedyono, M.EngSc and the first head of the department was Ir. Djoko Setyanto, MSc.

In 1999, the first academic year for this department, there were 110 students, an indication that the society confides and places great hopes on this Industrial Engineering Department.

The Mechanical Engineering Department has eight laboratories:

- Laboratory for Computer Aided Design & Engineering
- Laboratory for Materials Science & Engineering
- Laboratory for Automation, Robotics & Mechatronics
- Laboratory for Computer Numerical Control (CNC) & Industrial Metrology
- Laboratory for Manufacturing Processes
- Laboratory for Aerodynamics & Fluid Mechanics
- Laboratory for Mechanical Experiments
- Laboratory for Energy Conversion & Renewable Energy

=== Law ===
The Faculty of Law was founded on July 3, 1965, admitting 141 students. The class started early in September 1965 using the St. Theresa Junior High School building in Central Jakarta. One month later, the G-30-S incident broke out, followed by mass demonstrations by students. It was not until February 1, 1967, that the class resumed.

The class at Semanggi Campus began earlier in March 1971. For the first 10 years, there was no change to the number of the students, with only one study program. Until 1986, by average, each year, no more than 100 students were admitted. However, as of 1987, every year more and more students applied. Over 2003–2004, 325 to 350 prospective students of an average 1,000 applicants have been admitted.

Now the Faculty of Law has four concentration programs: Civil Law, Criminal Law, State Administration/International Law, and Economic and Business Law. When it first opened there were only 141 students but by the second semester of 2004/2005 there were 1,525 registered students.

A survey by Tempo magazine in October 2003 and 2004 ranked the Faculty of Law number three among the favorite places to study Law. The survey was conducted in seven major cities (Jakarta, Bandung, Surabaya, Semarang, Yogyakarta, Malang, and Medan) to 1,100 respondents: parents of senior high school students and the students themselves

=== Medicine ===
In 1964, Dr. K.S. Gani, DPH, Dr. J. Soegondho Roewidodarmo, and Dr. A.H. Tjahjadi moved to realize the idea of founding a medicine faculty in a Catholic educational institution.

On December 27, 1967, the Decree of Atma Jaya Foundation regarding the establishment of a Medical Faculty was issued. The class began in March 1968 at St. Carolus Hospital's Complex and laboratory practice was held at the laboratory of the Medical Faculty of Universitas Indonesia. On September 12, 1969, the faculty was granted a "registered" status from the Department of Education and Culture. The year 1969 witnessed the construction of the first decently permanent building at Semanggi Campus with the help from DITH (Directoraat International Technische Hulp), an agency of the Dutch government.

Atma Jaya Hospital, the place where doctors experience their clinical education, was used for the first time in 1976. Before Atma Jaya Hospital was completed, most clinical educations were done at St. Carolus Hospital, Gatot Subroto Hospital, Community Health Center Melani, and many others.

Since 1991 all the learning process has been held at Pluit Campus, about 12 km away from the main campus of Atma Jaya, in the same location with Atma Jaya Hospital. Since its establishment until 1996, the Medical Faculty of Atma Jaya Indonesia Catholic University had used the Indonesia Doctor Education Core Curriculum I (KIPDI I) and KIPDI II until 2005. As of 2006, FKUAJ uses KIPDI III, a Competence Based National Curriculum for Doctors' Education for primary health service doctors with family doctor approaches.

=== Psychology ===
The learning and teaching process began in 1992 based on the Decree of the Director General of University, regarding the "registered" status of the psychology study program/department for S1 program at the Psychology Faculty.

On March 1, 1995, the status was improved into "acknowledged" based on the Decree of the Director General of University Education.

On December 22, 1998, based on the Decree of the University National Accreditation Board of the Department of Education and Culture, regarding the Result and Accreditation Rank of the Study Program for the Degree Program, the Psychology Faculty was accredited B with 553.7 points.

On July 22, 2004, based on the Decree of the University National Accreditation Board of the Department of Education and Culture, regarding the Result and Accreditation Rank of the Study Program for the Degree Program, the Psychology Faculty was accredited A with 364 points

=== Biotechnology ===
To develop biotechnology in Indonesia, the Biotechnology Faculty at the university was established in 2002.

The faculty includes programmes of study in Environmental and Industrial Biology, Medical Biotechnology, Bioinformatics and Bio-ethics. With the opening of this faculty, Atma Jaya became the first university in Indonesia to have a faculty of Biotechnology.

=== Postgraduate studies ===
On 16 October 1992, Atma Jaya University began offering a master's degree in Linguistics, with a focus on the English language. On 4 October 1993, this was followed by the introduction of a master's degree in Management.

== Cooperation with foreign universities, institutes, and associations ==
Atma Jaya cooperates with foreign universities for student exchange programs, lecturer exchanges, scholarships, joint research, and other activities:

- University of Illinois (USA)
- Loyola University Chicago (USA)
- Universiti Tunku Abdul Rahman (Malaysia)
- Kanda University of International Studies (Japan)
- Southern Taiwan University of Technology (Taiwan)
- Chung Yuan Christian University (Taiwan)
- Woosong University Solbridge International (South Korea)
- Kyungsung University (South Korea)
- Catholic University of Korea (South Korea)
- Sogang University (South Korea)
- Daegu Mirae College (South Korea)
- University of Santo Tomas (the Philippines)
- The University of New South Wales (Australia)
- Flinders University (Australia)
- University of Queensland (Australia)
- Maastricht University (the Netherlands)
- Radboud University (the Netherlands)
- Universitat Regensburg (Germany)
- Gelsenkirchen University of Applied Sciences-Bolcholt Campus (Germany)
- University of Applied Sciences Würzburg-Schweinfurt (Germany)
- The Webropol University (Germany)

With institutes and associations abroad, among others:

- National Center for Genetic Engineering and Biotechnology (BIOTEC)|National Center for Genetic Engineering and Biotechnology (Thailand)
- National Science and Technology Development Agency (Thailand)
- BIOTECH (Thailand)
- The Australian Consortium for In Country Indonesian Studies (Australia)
- Coca-Cola Foundation (USA)
- Max Planck Institute for Evolutionary Anthropology (Germany)
- German Caritas Association (Germany)
- The Katholiescher Akademischer Auslander Dienst (KAAD)

== See also ==
- Atma Jaya University, Yogyakarta
- List of universities in Indonesia
- Christianity in Indonesia
