= President Sukarno's Order of the Day (8 March 1966) =

Response to military dissatisfaction, precedes Suharto's takeover

The Order of the Day of the Supreme Commander of the Armed Forces/President/Great Leader of the Revolution dated 8 March 1966 (Republican spelling Indonesian: Perintah Harian Panglima Tertinggi Angkatan Bersendjata/Presiden/Panglima Besar Revolusi pada tanggal 8 Maret 1966), colloquially known as President Sukarno's Order of the Day of 8 March 1966, was basically a statement that he was still the president of Indonesia, and was issued in response to a warning from Lt. Gen. Suharto two days previously that there was dissatisfaction among the officer corps of the Indonesian Military. It was followed three days later by the Order of 11 March, which effectively transferred authority to Suharto.

== Text of the document ==
The document read as follows:

ORDER OF THE DAY OF THE PRESIDENT/HOLDER OF THE MPRS MANDATE/SUPREME COMMANDER OF THE ARMED FORCES OF THE REPUBLIC OF INDONESIA/GREAT LEADER OF THE REVOLUTION

JAKARTA, 8 MARCH 1966

At present it is increasingly clear that there are indications or symptoms of counterrevolutionary and subversive activities aimed at diverting our revolution to the right, as well as directly or indirectly aimed at undermining the leadership, authority or policies of the President/Holder of the MPRS Mandate/Supreme Commander of the Armed Forces of the Republic of Indonesia/Great Leader of the Revolution.
Considering:
the statement of loyalty and obedience from the military commanders, and from political parties and their mass organizations to the President/Holder of the MPRS Mandate/Supreme Commander of the Armed Forces of the Republic of Indonesia/Great Leader of the Revolution.
Therefore, we, President/Holder of the MPRS Mandate/Supreme Commander of the Armed Forces of the Republic of Indonesia/Great Leader of the Revolution order all of the armed forces of Indonesia together with all ranks and all political parties and their mass organizations, functional groups and all progressive revolutionary members of society no matter where you are, as follows:

1. Increase your vigilance to face all types of provocation and infiltration of subversive and counter revolutionary networks that continuously endeavor to divide the unity and integrity between the people, the Indonesian National Armed Forces and the great leader of the revolution, as well as towards all endeavors that aim to divert our revolution to the right.
2. Increase this alertness in order to wreck every endeavor that directly or indirectly is aimed at undermining the leadership, authority or policies of the President/Holder of the MPRS Mandate/Supreme Commander of the Armed Forces of the Republic of Indonesia/Great Leader of the Revolution.
3. Foster the feeling of national unity and integrity that is progressive revolutionary as well as at here to the soldier's oath or Sapta Marga to defend the unity between the people, the armed forces of Indonesia and the great leader of the revolution.
4. Become the police officers of the nation in the form of the true Sukarno Front both in a physical and mental sense, that is ready and having courage at any time to safeguard and protect the President/Holder of the MPRS Mandate/Supreme Commander of the Armed Forces of the Republic of Indonesia/Great Leader of the Revolution as well as consequently implement his teachings.
5. Avoid illegal acts, slander and continue to obey my commands.
6. Intensify the struggle against the nekolim as well as the British Malaysia project, and armed with the five charms of the revolution we will make a success of the forthcoming Conefo.

Pay close attention to and carry out this order of mine. May God be with us.

Jakarta 8 March 1966
President/Holder of the MPRS Mandate/Supreme Commander of the Armed Forces of the Republic of Indonesia/Great Leader of the Revolution
signed

SUKARNO
