= Ignatius Joseph Kasimo Hendrowahyono =

Indonesian Catholic politician (1900–1986)

Mr. Ignatius Joseph Kasimo Hendrowahyono
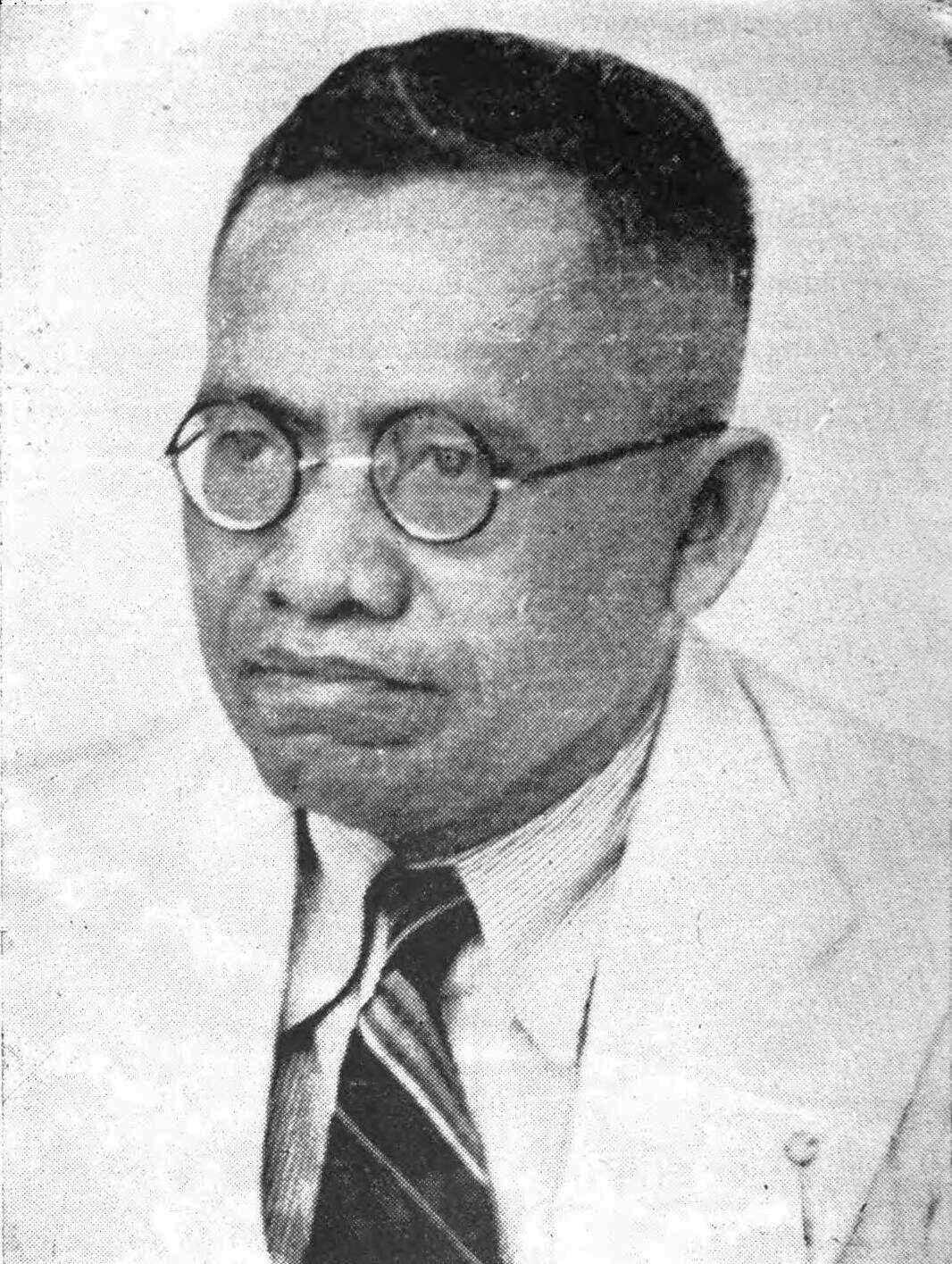
- Portrait, c. 1954

5th Minister of Trade
- In office 4 August 1948 – 21 January 1950
- President: Sukarno
- Preceded by: Sjafruddin Prawiranegara
- Succeeded by: Tandiono Manu
- In office 12 August 1955 – 24 March 1956
- President: Sukarno
- Preceded by: Roosseno
- Succeeded by: Burhanuddin

6th Minister of Agriculture
- In office 4 August 1948 – 21 January 1950
- President: Sukarno
- Preceded by: Sjafruddin Prawiranegara
- Succeeded by: Sadjarwo

Personal details
- Born: 10 April 1900 Dutch East Indies
- Died: 1 August 1986 (aged 86) Indonesia
- Party: Catholic Party (Indonesia)
- Spouse: Aloysia Moedjirah
- Children: 6

Ignatius Joseph Kasimo Hendrowahyono (10 April 1900 – 1 August 1986) was an Indonesian politician and national hero. He was a co-founder of the Catholic Party and was himself a Catholic of Javanese descent like his fellow party confrère, Fredericus Soetrisno Harjadi.

== Early life ==
Hendrowahyono was born in present-day Yogyakarta. His father, Ronosentiko, was a Yogyakarta palace soldier, serving the Mentrijero brigade at the time. His mother was Dalikem and she was a housewife and market stall owner. Hendrowahyono was the second child of the family and one older brother and nine other siblings.

Owing to his father's prestigious position in that era, Hendrowahyono was able to attend school in the Dutch East Indies. He first attended Tweede Inlandsche School in Kampung Gading. Later on, he entered a teaching college in Muntilan, where he was introduced to Catholicism by the school's founder, Romo (Father) van Lith. He was baptized in 1913 and received his Christian name Ignatius Joseph. He moved to Buitenzorg (now Bogor) in 1918 to continue his studies at Middelbare Landbouw School.

== Pre-1945 Indonesian independence ==
While studying at Middelbare Landbouw School, Hendrowahyono joined the youth organization Jong Java, which was associated with the Youth Pledge declaration. In 1923, he started a political party called the Catholic Javanese Political Party (Indonesian: Pakempalan Politik Katolik Djawi) which by 1933 became known as the Indonesian Catholic Political Party (Indonesian: Persatoean Politik Katolik Indonesia). Hendrowahyono also became a member of Volksraad from 1931 to 1942 and was involved in the committee behind the Soetardjo Petition.

== Post-1945 Indonesian independence ==
Hendrowahyono became a member of the Central Indonesian National Committee in 1945. Within the same time period, Hendrowahyono also started the process of consolidating several Catholic political parties in Indonesia into one entity: the Indonesian Catholic Party (Indonesian: Partai Katolik Republik Indonesia). He also started focusing on agricultural and plantation issues plaguing the nation. This interest culminated in his appointment as the Secretary of Agriculture and Secretary of Commerce. He also maintained strategic parliamentary positions as Indonesia underwent several governmental changes, including during the United States of Indonesia period.
