= Ben Mang Reng Say =

Indonesian politician (1928–2003)

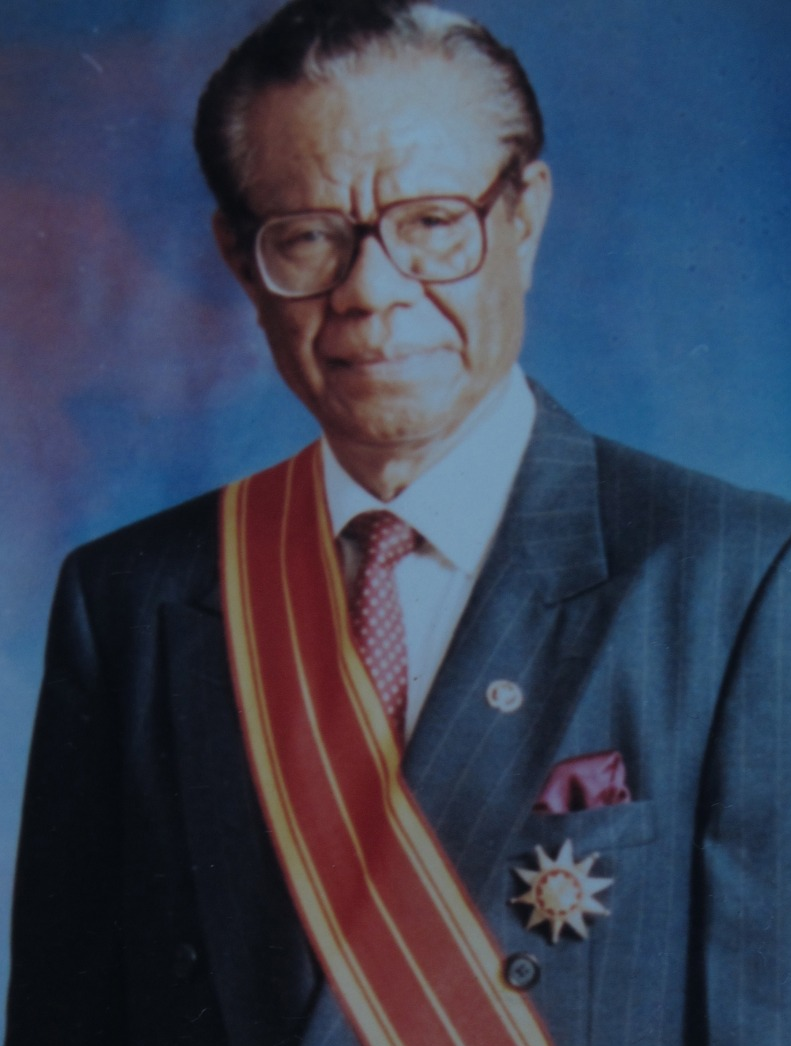

Vice Chairman of The People's Representative Council of Mutual Assistance
- In office 1966–1971

Personal details
- Born: 15 June 1928 Umauta, Sikka, Dutch East Indies (now East Nusa Tenggara, Indonesia
- Died: 16 August 2003 (aged 75) Jakarta, Indonesia
- Party: Catholic Party (Indonesia), Indonesian Democratic Party
- Spouse: Dona Maria Yosefa Nana Da Silva
- Children: 2 sons and 3 daughters
- Education: Universitas Gajah Mada

Benedictus Mang Reng Say (15 June 1928 – 16 August 2003) was an Indonesian politician who was appointed Vice Chairman of the People's Representative Council of Mutual Assistance (Indonesian: Dewan Perwakilan Rakyat Gotong Royong, DPR-GR) 1966–1971. In Indonesia's historical records Ben Mang Reng Say along with Frans Seda plays an important role in the Rome meeting under Foreign Minister Adam Malik and General Murtopo in order to discuss East Timor's peaceful integration into the unitary state of Indonesia territory.

== Early life ==
After finishing Folk School in Bola, East Nusa Tenggara (1934–1937) His uncle Mo’an Petrus Pitang who was then serving as Kapitan sends Say into studying in Shackel School in Ndao-Ende, East Nusa Tenggara (1937–1942), after graduating from one of the most prestigious school in East Nusa Tenggara at that time he worked as a police officer in Maumere (1943–1946), Bajawa (1946–1948) and Makasar (1948–1950). Apparently this line of work was not for him, so he resign from his position as a police and continued his studies in Meer Uitgebreid Lager Onderwijs /MULO in Makasar (1949–1951). He was lucky enough to continue his studies, not like other Indonesian teenager at that time, he could continue his study to Yogyakarta at the University of Gajah Mada (UGM) Department of Law, Social and Political Department, and on 23 November 1956 he succeed to receive his (Drs) degree in Social Science Politics majoring in Government, and then work as a civil servant in The Department of Home Affairs.

== The Constituent Assembly ==
The 1956 election brought 10 people from the Catholic Party as a Member of the Constituent Assembly, Say was appointed as Secretary of the Catholic Party Faction (1956–1959) accompanying IJ Kasimo as Chairman.

== The People's Representative Council of Mutual Assistance ==
On 31 December 1964, Say was appointed as a member of The People's Representative Council of Mutual Assistance (Indonesian: Dewan Perwakilan Rakyat Gotong Royong, DPR-GR). After The 30 September Movement (Indonesian: Gerakan 30 September, abbreviated as G30S), it demands personnel changes in The People's Representative Council of Mutual Assistance, and that conditions creates an opportunity for Say to earn the trust of the Catholic party to occupy the position of Vice Chairman of The People's Representative Council of Mutual Assistance Leader (1966–1971)

== Indonesian Catholic Party ==
Say was the last chairman of the Indonesian Catholic Party, he was appointed party chairman in 1971, and after 50 years Catholic Party exist in Indonesia, on 10 January 1973 it dissolves with the Indonesian Democratic Party (Indonesian: Partai Demokrasi Indonesia, abbreviated as PDI).

== Supreme Advisory Council of the Republic of Indonesia ==
Say was appointed as the member of The Supreme Advisory Council of the Republic of Indonesia (Indonesian: Dewan Pertimbangan Agung Republik Indonesia, abbreviated as DPA) in 1973–1976, and in 1988–1993 for the second time he was appointed as a member of The Supreme Advisory Council of the Republic of Indonesia as The Vice Chairman in-charge of the political affairs.

== Ambassador ==
For a year (1975–1976) Say was appointed as The Ambassador of Indonesia for the government of the Republic of Portugal, at that time he was sent to Rome to discuss the steps for East Timor integration to Indonesian territory, but the meeting that supposed to run peacefully ended with bloodshed, Six months he work, and managed to make a "courageous" report to the United Nations. he admitted that about 200 people killed by army bullets during demonstrations demanding the independence of East Timor. This case streak the faces of the Indonesian military and eventually it ends with a trial of many military officers and civilians. And in 1976–1980 Say was appointed as The Ambassador of Indonesia for the government of the Republic of Mexico, and received The Aguila Azteca Primera Banda medal of honors from the Mexican Government in 1980.

== Atma Jaya Catholic University ==
He was noted as one of the founders of Atma Jaya Catholic University, he also teaches politics there and in 1962 appointed as the University Rector.

== Family ==
He was married to Dona Maria Yosefa Nana Da Silva the daughter of a Tribe King Don Thomas Da Silva in Maumere (26 April 1955) and from this marriage he has had 2 sons and 3 daughters.

== Honors ==
- Bintang Mahaputra Adipradana II - received in Jakarta (19 May 1973)
- Aguila Azteca Primera Banda – received in Mexico City (5 September 1980)

== Death ==
Say died in Jakarta on 16 August 2003 after suffering a stroke and heart conditions.
