= Mohammad Jusuf =

Indonesian military general (1928–2004)

General (Ret.) Mohammad Jusuf
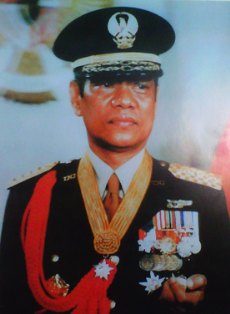
- Official portrait, c. 1980

7th Commander of the Armed Forces of the Republic of Indonesia
- In office 17 April 1978 – 28 March 1983
- President: Suharto
- Preceded by: General Maraden Panggabean
- Succeeded by: General Benny Moerdani

15th Minister of Defense and Security
- In office 29 March 1978 – 19 March 1983
- President: Suharto
- Preceded by: Maraden Panggabean
- Succeeded by: Poniman

9th Minister of Industry
- In office 10 June 1968 – 28 March 1978
- President: Suharto
- Preceded by: Ashari Danudirdjo; Muhammad Sanusi
- Succeeded by: Abdoel R. Soehoed

19th Minister of Trade
- In office 11 October 1967 – 6 June 1968
- President: Sukarno
- Preceded by: Ashari Danudirdjo
- Succeeded by: Sumitro Djojohadikusumo

Minister of Basic Industries
- In office 21 February 1966 – 25 July 1966
- President: Sukarno
- Preceded by: Hadi Thayeb
- Succeeded by: Suharnoko Harbani

Minister of Light Industries
- In office 25 July 1966 – 17 October 1967
- President: Sukarno
- Preceded by: Suharnoko Harbani
- Succeeded by: Ashari Danudirdjo
- In office 27 August 1964 – 21 February 1966
- President: Sukarno
- Preceded by: Position established
- Succeeded by: Suharnoko Harbani

Personal details
- Born: Andi Mohammad Jusuf Amir; 23 June 1928 Bone, Dutch East Indies
- Died: 8 September 2004 (aged 76) Makassar, Indonesia
- Party: Independent
- Spouse: Elly Saelan
- Occupation: Army officer; politician

Military service
- Allegiance: Indonesia
- Branch/service: Indonesian Army
- Years of service: 1945–1983
- Rank: General
- Unit: Infantry
- Commands: Indonesian Armed Forces
- Battles/wars: Indonesian National Revolution; South Maluku rebellion; Permesta rebellion
- Service no.: 18102

General Andi Mohammad Jusuf Amir (23 June 1928 – 8 September 2004), more commonly known as M. Jusuf, was an Indonesian military general and a witness to the signing of the Supersemar document transferring power from President Sukarno to General Suharto.

== Early life ==
Jusuf was born in Kayuara, Bone, South Sulawesi on 23 June 1928.

Not much is known about Jusuf's early life other than the fact he was a Bugis aristocrat as witnessed by the titular name "Andi" in front of his name. Jusuf would later denounce his aristocratic background by dropping Andi from his name.

== Military career ==
=== The Indonesian National Revolution ===
When Nationalist leaders, Sukarno and Mohammad Hatta proclaimed Indonesia's Independence on 17 August 1945, Jusuf showed his support by joining the Devotion of the Indonesian People from Sulawesi (KRIS). Towards the end of 1945, with the Dutch Government preparing to retake Indonesia, Jusuf and his fellow KRIS members sailed for Java to join in the fighting.

Jusuf started his military career in the Navy, becoming the adjutant of Navy Lieutenant Colonel Kahar Muzakkar at the 10th Navy Staff Commando headquarters in Yogyakarta.

=== Sulawesi ===
By 1949, Jusuf had switched over to the Army, becoming a part of the Military Police before becoming a member of the Eastern Indonesia Military Commission.

In 1950, Jusuf became the adjutant of Colonel Alexander Evert Kawilarang, the Commander of KODAM VII/ Wirabuana whose security brief covered the whole of Eastern Indonesia. In this position, Jusuf participated in putting down rebellions by the Republic of South Maluku (RMS). Jusuf then continued his military career, serving as a Regimental Chief of Staff in Manado, an Operations Assistant to the Commander of KODAM VII/Wirabuana, and the Head of the General Reserves.

=== Universal Struggle Charter (Permesta) ===
During the mid-1950s there was a concern among the people of Sulawesi that the Central Government in Jakarta was not catering to their needs. There were calls made for decentralization in all aspects of Governance, ranging from economic development to security.

Being a soldier, Jusuf was interested in the decentralization of security matters and along with like-minded colleagues concluded that the Sulawesinese should be responsible for the security in their region. Jusuf also showed concern by the fact that TT VII/Wirabuana's security brief covered all of Eastern Indonesia whereas the KODAMs in Western Indonesia had a specific area to cover.

This concern for decentralization culminated in the Permesta statement which was signed by important figures in Sulawesi (including Jusuf) on 2 March 1957. The statement also declared a state of emergency in Eastern Indonesia. At this time, Jusuf became an operations officer for Permesta.

It was not long, however, before Jusuf abandoned the movement. In May 1957, Army Chief of Staff Abdul Haris Nasution authorized the formation of KODAM XIV/Hasanuddin, KODAM/South East Sulawesi, and KODAM XVI/Udayana to cover the security of Sulawesi. With his request now fulfilled, there was no reason for Jusuf to stay with Permesta. Instead, Jusuf became a spy, reporting the results of meetings to the Central Government who were suspicious that Permesta was a separatist movement.

=== KODAM/South East Sulawesi ===
Jusuf dropped his charade with Permesta in May 1958 with his appointment as Commander of KODAM/South East Sulawesi. From his position, Jusuf assisted the Central Government in putting down the Permesta movement.

=== KODAM XIV/Hasanuddin ===
In October 1959, Jusuf was transferred to KODAM XIV/Hasanuddin to become its Commander. As Commander of KODAM XIV/Hasanuddin, Jusuf was responsible for the security of South Sulawesi.

=== Minister of Industry ===
In August 1964, Jusuf was named as Minister of Industry. Although this was a civilian post, it was not a surprise that Jusuf was appointed to this position as Sukarno had other members of ABRI in his Cabinet for reasons other than defense and security (Example: Lieutenant General Hidayat as Minister of Telecommunications and Ali Sadikin of the Marines serving as Minister of Transportation).

=== Supersemar ===
On 11 March 1966, Jusuf attended a Cabinet meeting at the Presidential Palace, the first since Sukarno reshuffled the Dwikora Cabinet at the end of February. The meeting did not last long before Sukarno, after receiving a note from the Commander of his Bodyguards, suddenly left the room. When the meeting was over, Jusuf and the Minister of Veterans Affairs, Basuki Rachmat, went outside the Presidential Place to join Amirmachmud the Commander of KODAM V/Jaya. Jusuf was then updated on what happened and was informed that Sukarno had left for Bogor by helicopter because it was not secure in Jakarta.

Jusuf then suggested that the three of them go to Bogor to provide moral support for Sukarno. The three then went to the residence of Lieutenant General Suharto, the Commander of the Army who had established a position as Sukarno's strongest political opponent. According to Amirmachmud, Suharto asked the three Generals to tell Sukarno of his readiness to restore security should the President order it.

At Bogor, the three met with Sukarno who was unhappy with the security and with Amirmachmud's insistence that everything was secure. Sukarno then began discussing options with the three Generals before finally Sukarno began discussing options with Basuki, Jusuf, and Amirmachmud before finally asking them how he can take care of the situation. Jusuf and Basuki were silent, but Amirmachmud that Sukarno give Suharto some powers and govern Indonesia with him so that everything could be secured. The meeting then disbanded as Sukarno began preparing a Presidential Decree.

It was dusk when the Decree that would become Supersemar was finally prepared and awaiting Sukarno's signature. Sukarno had some last-minute doubts but Jusuf, together with the two Generals and Sukarno's inner circle in the Cabinet who had also made the trip to Bogor encouraged him to sign. Sukarno finally signed and handed Supersemar to Basuki to be passed on to Suharto.

There is controversy over Jusuf's role in Supersemar. One account states that Jusuf came to Bogor with a pink folder with Supersemar already pre-prepared on a paper with the logo of the Army on it and that there were four Generals instead of three; the fourth General being Maraden Panggabean. Sukarno was then intimidated at gunpoint by Basuki and Panggabean before signing the pre-prepared Supersemar.

Jusuf also managed to get hold of a copy of Supersemar.

On 13 March, Sukarno summoned Jusuf, Basuki, and Amirmachmud. Sukarno was angry that Suharto had banned the Communist Party of Indonesia (PKI) and told the three Generals that Supersemar did not contain such instructions. Sukarno then ordered that a letter be produced to clarify the contents of Supersemar but nothing ever came up apart from the copies that former Cuban Ambassador, AM Hanafi collected.

=== New Order ===
As the leadership of the nation changed from Sukarno to Suharto, Jusuf continued as Minister of Industry. It was also noteworthy that although holding a civilian post, Jusuf's military career continued as he continued to receive promotions from this position.

=== ABRI Commander ===
In April 1978, Jusuf was appointed to the position of the Commander of ABRI while concurrently taking on the position of Minister of Defense and Security.

As Commander, Jusuf was commissioned by Suharto to start a process of integrating (Memanunggalkan) ABRI with the people. Jusuf would later on say that he was not sure of what this order meant but took it to mean that he was to make ABRI neutral in politics instead of taking Golkar's side. In this he was successful as in the 1982 Legislative Elections, Golkar did not get the active support from ABRI that it enjoyed in the previous two Legislative Elections that it competed in.

Jusuf was also responsible for the ABRI Enters the Villages (ABRI Masuk Desa) program. In this program, ABRI soldiers were sent to rural areas to help with infrastructure development.

During his term as Commander of ABRI, Jusuf developed a reputation as a General who was interested in the welfare of his men. He regularly toured the regions to visit the soldiers and enquire about their families and conditions. This made him extremely popular in the ranks of ABRI at the expense of his relationship with Suharto, who began to see Jusuf as a threat.

In 1982, a top officials meeting was held and attended by Suharto, Jusuf, and Amirmachmud who then served as Minister of Home Affairs. During the meeting, Amirmachmud commented on Jusuf's popularity and asked him to explain himself to Suharto. Sensing the accusation behind the request, Jusuf lost his temper and promised Suharto that he never had any ambitions for power in doing his duties. Suharto's suspicion seemed to have hurt Jusuf and never attended Cabinet meetings until he was discharged from his position in April 1983.

== Post-Military Career and Retired Life ==
From 1983 to 1993, Jusuf served as Chairman of the Audit Board (BPK). It was a job from which he expected to reach great things, considering his predecessor, Umar Wirahadikusumah who went on to become vice president. However, that was the end of his involvement with the Government.

Jusuf had a close relationship with Jusuf Kalla and at one stage considered showing Kalla the copy of Supersemar which he retrieved from 1966. Jusuf changed his mind and showed Kalla a photocopied version instead.

When Jusuf announced his intentions to produce a memoir of his life, there was widespread expectation of what his account of Supersemar would be like (out of the 3 Generals who witnessed the signing of Supersemar, only Amir Machmud had produced his account). At first, Suharto trusted Jusuf to publish the memoir on his own but changed his mind, asking Jusuf to let the State Secretariat publish it. Jusuf rejected this offer.

In his retired life, Jusuf was active in social activities and headed a foundation in charge of running a mosque as well as contributing to the running of a hospital.

== Death ==
Jusuf died on 8 September 2004.

== Family ==
Jusuf was married to Elly Saelan, with whom he had one son.

== Miscellaneous ==
Although Amirmachmud had subtly accused him of being ambitious, Jusuf remained a close friend with his fellow Supersemar eyewitness. Before Amirmachmud died, he requested that Jusuf attend the funeral. However, Jusuf was unable to attend Amirmachmud's funeral. Jusuf also received a secret letter from Amirmachmud.

== Honours ==
=== National honours ===
- Star of the Republic of Indonesia, 2nd Class (Indonesian: Bintang Republik Indonesia Adipradana) (7 August 1995)
- Star of Mahaputera, 2nd Class (Indonesian: Bintang Mahaputera Adipradana) (10 March 1973)
- Star of Merit, 2nd Class (Indonesian: Bintang Jasa Pratama) (10 March 1965)

=== Foreign honours ===
- Malaysia:
  - Honorary Commander of the Most Esteemed Order of the Defender of the Realm (P.M.N.) (1979)

Political offices
Preceded by Maraden Panggabean	Minister of Defense and Security; 1978–1983	Succeeded by Poniman
Military offices
Preceded by Maraden Panggabean	Commander of the Indonesian Armed Forces; 1978–1983	Succeeded by Benny Moerdani
