= Supersemar =

1966 document signed by Indonesian President

Order of Eleventh March
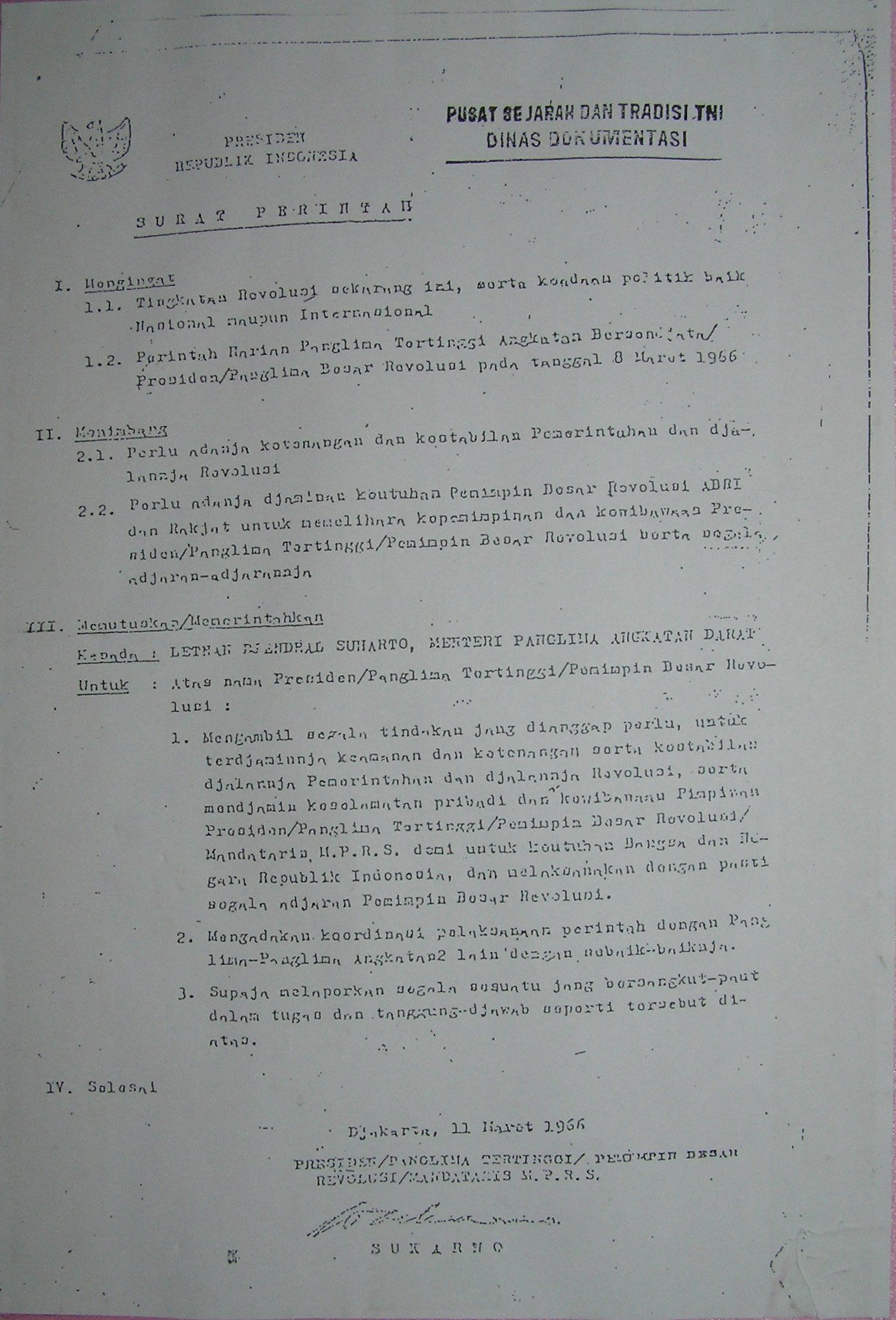
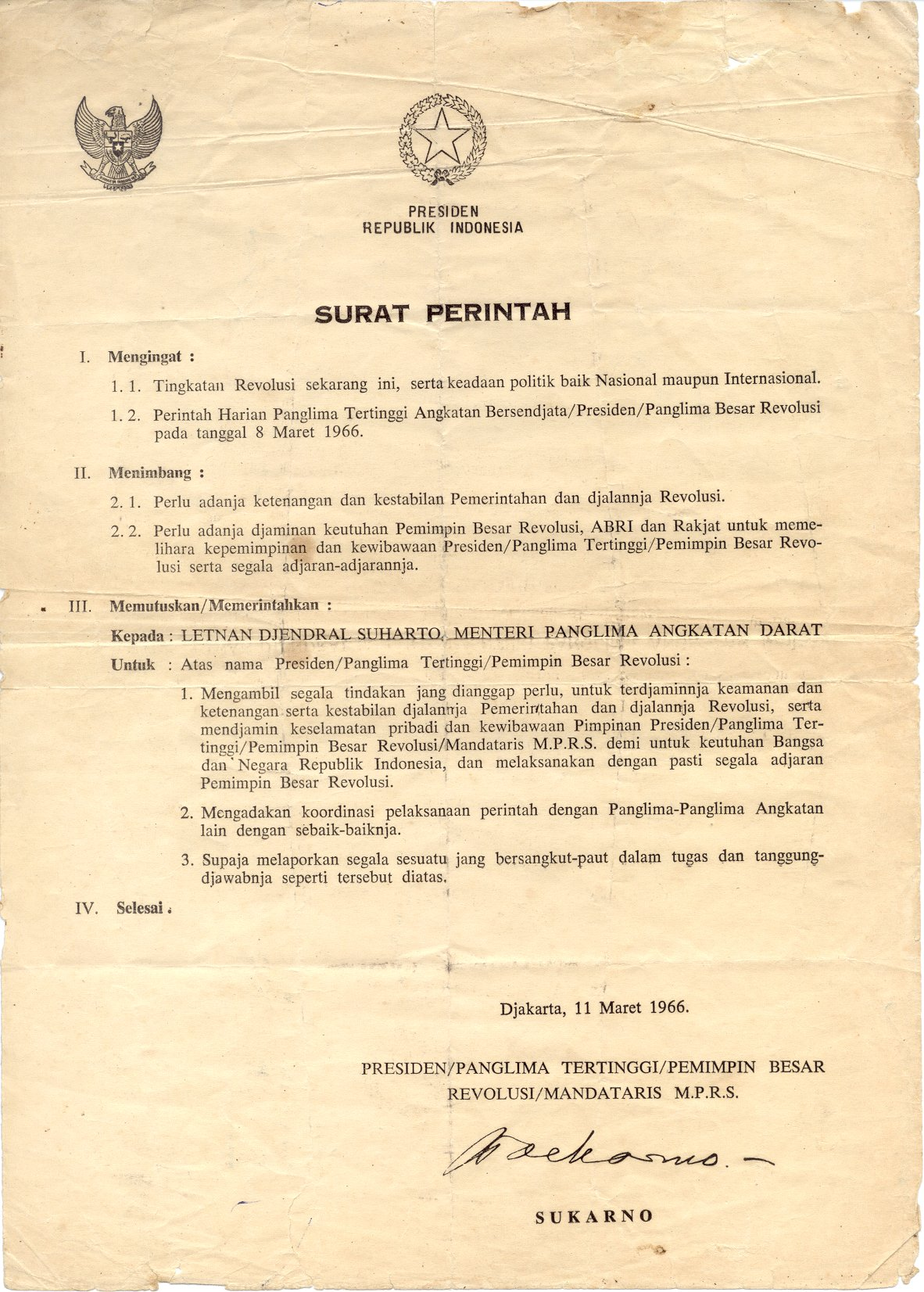
- Two versions of the Supersemar document: Top: Military version of the document; Bottom: State secretary version of the document
- Ratified: 11 March 1966
- Repealed: 28 October 1971
- Location: [See section]
- Signatories: Sukarno
- Purpose: To give a mandate for Lieutenant General Suharto, as Commander of Kopkamtib, to take "all actions deemed necessary" to address the security situation and stability of the government.

The Order of Eleventh March (Indonesian: Surat Perintah Sebelas Maret), commonly referred to by its syllabic abbreviation Supersemar, was a document signed by the Indonesian President Sukarno on 11 March 1966, giving army commander Lt. Gen. Suharto authority to take whatever measures he "deemed necessary" to restore order to the chaotic situation during the Indonesian mass killings of 1965–66. The abbreviation "Supersemar" is also a play on the name of Semar, the mystic and powerful figure who commonly appears in Javanese mythology including wayang puppet shows. The invocation of Semar was presumably intended to help draw on Javanese mythology to lend support to Suharto's legitimacy during the period of the transition of authority from Sukarno to Suharto.

In effect, the Supersemar came to be seen as the key instrument of the transfer of executive power from Sukarno to Suharto.

The Provisional People's Consultative Assembly in its 1966 General Session subsequently elevated the Supersemar into a semi-constitutional resolution irrevocable by Sukarno. This resolution explicitly stated that the Supersemar would cease to have legal power following "the formation of a People's Consultative Assembly from a general election." Elections were held in 1971 and the members were sworn in on 28 October 1971.

== Background ==
On 30 September 1965, a group calling itself the 30 September Movement killed six senior army generals, seized temporary control of parts of the center of Jakarta, and issued a number of decrees over Republic of Indonesia Radio. Suharto and his allies defeated the movement and in the rather drawn-out process which extended out for six months or more, Sukarno's formal position as president of the nation was slowly but steadily ebbed away.

Over the next few months Suharto and the armed forces seized the initiative. The armed forces accused its long-standing rival, the Indonesian Communist Party (PKI), of being behind the "coup attempt" and an anti-Communist purge ensued.

During a cabinet meeting (which Suharto did not attend) on 11 March 1966, while student demonstrations protected by the army took place in Jakarta, troops without insignia surrounded the presidential palace where the meeting was being held. It later transpired that these were from Army special forces. Sukarno was advised to leave the meeting and did so, flying to the presidential palace in Bogor, 60 km south of Jakarta, by helicopter.

Later that afternoon three army generals, Maj. Gen. Basuki Rahmat, Minister for Veterans Affairs, Brig. Gen. M Jusuf, Minister for Basic Industry and Brig. Gen. Amir Machmud, Commander of the 5th Military Regional Command, visited Sukarno (who was accompanied by Deputy Prime Ministers Johannes Leimena, Chaerul Saleh and Subandrio) and came away with the signed Supersemar, which they then presented to Suharto. The next day Suharto used the powers thus conferred on him to ban the PKI and, on 18 March, fifteen Sukarno loyalist ministers were arrested.

Suharto changed the composition of the Provisional People's Consultative Assembly (MPRS) and a year later, in March 1967, the MPRS voted to strip Sukarno of his powers and appointed Suharto acting president. In 1968 the MPRS removed the word 'acting' and over two years after the events of September 1965 Suharto became the president of Indonesia. The process of transferring the presidency from Sukarno to Suharto had taken over two years. Suharto remained in power as president until he resigned during the political crisis in Indonesia in May 1998.

== The document ==
The Supersemar itself is a simple document of fewer than 200 words. It reads as follows:

THE PRESIDENT OF THE REPUBLIC OF INDONESIA

ORDER

I. Considering
1.1 The current state of the Revolution, together with the national and international political situation
1.2 The Order of the Day of the Supreme Commander of the Armed Forces of the Republic/President/Great Leader of the Revolution dated 8 March 1966

II. Taking into account
2.1 The need for calm and stability of the Government and the progress of the Revolution
2.2 The need for a guarantee of integrity of the Great Leader of the Revolution, [the Armed Forces] and the People to preserve the leadership and obligations of the President/Supreme Commander/Great Leader of the Revolution and his teachings

III. Decides/Orders
LIEUTENANT GENERAL SOEHARTO, MINISTER/COMMANDER OF THE ARMY
To: In the name of the President/Supreme Commander/Great Leader of the Revolution
1. Take all measures deemed necessary to guarantee security and calm as well as the stability of the progress of the Revolution, as well as to guarantee the personal safety and authority of the leadership of the President/Supreme Commander/Great Leader of the Revolution/holder of the Mandate of the [Provisional People's Consultative Assembly] for the sake of the integrity of the Nation and State of the Republic of Indonesia, and to resolutely implement all the teachings of the Great Leader of the Revolution.
2. Coordinate the execution of orders with the commanders of the other forces to the best of his ability.
3. Report all actions related to duties and responsibilities as stated above.

IV. Ends

Jakarta, 11 March 1966

PRESIDENT/SUPREME COMMANDER/GREAT LEADER OF THE REVOLUTION/HOLDER OF THE MANDATE OF THE [PROVISIONAL PEOPLE'S CONSULTATIVE ASSEMBLY]

[signed]

SUKARNO

== Controversy ==
=== The circumstances surrounding the signing of the Supersemar ===
Indonesians usually end documents with the place and date of signing of the document. Given that the Supersemar was supposedly signed in Bogor, it is odd that the Supersemar is signed "Djakarta".

In his account of the events of March 1966, Hanafi, a close friend of Sukarno and ambassador to Cuba says that he went to Bogor on 12 March and met with Sukarno. He says that Sukarno told him Suharto had sent three generals with a document they had already prepared for him to sign. He says that Sukarno felt he had to sign it because he was cornered, but that the generals had promised to defend Sukarno and that the order would not be misused.

However, Martoidjojo, the commander of the presidential bodyguard, who went with Sukarno in the helicopter to Bogor, says that the Supersemar was typed in Bogor by Sukarno's adjutant and military secretary, Brig. Gen. Mochammed Sabur. Djamaluddin corroborates this.

The wording of the Supersemar itself could be read as a threat, namely the section reading "to guarantee the personal safety and authority of the leadership" of Sukarno. However, in 1998, accusations appeared of an even more direct threat, namely that two members of the presidential guard had seen Gen. M. Jusuf and Gen M. Panggabean, second assistant to the Army minister, pointing their pistols at Sukarno. M. Jusuf and others have denied this, and disputed that Panggabean was even present. They called into doubt the credibility of key parts of the accusations, and said it was impossible for the two men to be so close to the president at the time.

=== The disappearance of the original ===
One difficulty in historical research regarding the Supersemar is that the original document can no longer be found. When then-Vice President Megawati Sukarnoputri ordered the Indonesian National Archives to find it, they reported they only had two copies, one issued by the Army's Information Centre and another by the State Secretary, and that there were significant differences between them.

=== The existence of multiple versions ===
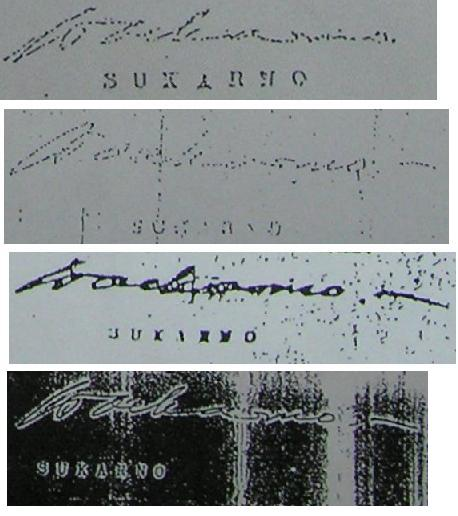
Signatures of Sukarno on the four versions

One of the publications to appear since the fall of Suharto points out that there were several versions of the Supersemar. Even before the fall of Suharto, an official publication commemorating 30 years of Indonesian independence reproduced two different versions of Supersemar.

There are a number of differences between the various versions of the Supersemar:

- In two versions, there is a missing plural marker after the word "force" (Angkatan) in section III, paragraph 2.
- In the same two versions, there is an extra definite article marker after the word "responsibilities" (tanggung-djawab) in section III paragraph 3.
- One version runs to two pages, whereas the other versions are all on one page.
- Sukarno's signature in one version lacks the dot-and-horizontal-line after the word "Soekarno".
- There are also minor differences in the proximity and shapes of the letters.

=== The Order of 13 March ===
According to Hanafi, in his discussions with Sukarno at the Bogor Palace on 12 March, Sukarno was angry that the Supersemar had been used to ban the PKI, as it was the prerogative of the president to ban political parties. He said he had asked Third Deputy Prime Minister Johannes Leimena to take a written order to Suharto, and that he would wait to see what Suharto's reaction was – whether he would obey it or not. He asked Hanafi to help Third Deputy Prime Minister Chaerul Saleh and First Deputy Prime Minister Subandrio.

The two men showed Hanafi the "Order of 13 March", which stated that the Order of 11 March was technical and administrative in nature, not political, warned General Suharto that he was not to take any actions outside the scope of the order, and asked Suharto to report to the president at the palace. Saleh planned to make copies of the order and distribute them to loyal members of the palace guard and to Sukarno's young followers. Hanafi says 5,000 copies were made, and that he took a few back to Jakarta with him, but he does not know what happened to the others.

In the official biography of Suharto, it is also said that Sukarno questioned Suharto's use of the Supersemar and sent Leimena to ask Suharto to take responsibility for his actions. Hanafi says that Suharto sent a message back via Leimena, who returned to Bogor later that evening, saying he would take responsibility for his actions, and that he was unable to come to Bogor as he was due to attend a meeting of all the military commanders at 11 am the following day, to which he invited Sukarno.
