= Fredericus Soetrisno Harjadi =

Indonesian politician

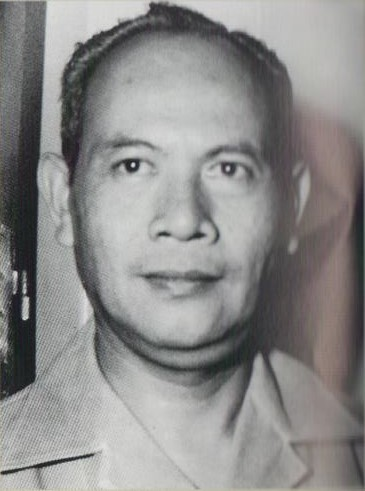

8th Minister of Social Affairs
- In office 6 September 1950 – 21 March 1951
- President: Sukarno
- Preceded by: Hamdani
- Succeeded by: Sjamsuddin Sutan Makmur

Personal details
- Born: December 26, 1899 Madiun, East Java, Dutch East Indies
- Died: April 9, 1969 (aged 69) Jakarta, Indonesia
- Party: Catholic Party
- Spouse: Raden Ayu Pancratia Soenarlestariyah (m. 1922; died 1957)
- Children: List: R. Eduardus Winarto (1924) Maria Antonia Sri Wiyati (January 1926) Aloysius Blasius Wisanto (December 1926) Johanes Bergmans Wiyono (1928) Franciscus Xaverius Wiyatno (1930) Maria Eleonora Sri Nuryati (1932) Maria Theresia Sri Untari (1934) Maria Christina Sri Wuryani (1936) Henricus Windarto (1938) Frederica Sri Lestari (1940) Veronica Sri Wardani (1942) Benedictus Winarno (1940) Theodorus Wiharto (1944) Josephine Sri Wiyanti (1946) Joseph Constantinus Wiyanto (1948) Margaretha Sri Windarti (1950)

Fredericus Soetrisno Harjadi (December 26, 1899 – April 9, 1969) was an Indonesian politician from the Catholic Party. He was appointed as the Minister of Social Affairs in the Natsir Cabinet. He was also one of the initiators of the Ramayana Insurance.

After finishing his school, Harjadi became a teacher at a MULO school. He ended his career as a teacher when he, along with I. J. Kasimo, established the Catholic Party in the Dutch East Indies. His political career later brought him to be appointed as the seventh Minister of Social Affairs in the Natsir Cabinet, from 6 September 1950 until 21 March 1951.

He was married to Raden Ayu Soenarlestariah in 1922. Soenarlestariah was born on 12 May 1904, and she was the great-great-great-granddaughter of Pakubuwono I.

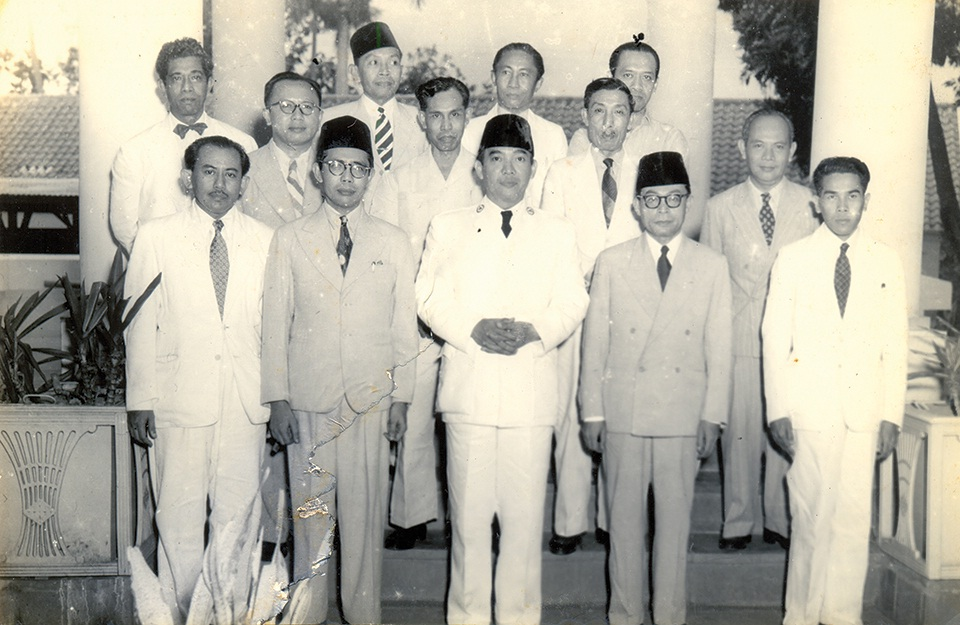
Photograph of the Natsir cabinet in 1950. Harjadi was the first from right in the second row.
