= Catholic Party (Indonesia) =

Political party in Indonesia (1923–1973)

- Abbreviation: PK, PKRI
- Chairman: Ignatius Joseph Kasimo Hendrowahyono (1945–65); Franciscus Xaverius Seda (1965–71); Ben Mang Reng Say (1971-1973)
- Founded: April 1923 (official founding date); 22 February 1925 (as PPKD); 8 December 1945 (as PKRI); 12 December 1949 (as Partai Katolik)
- Dissolved: 11 January 1973
- Merger of: PKRI; Parkit; Perkokaf; Permakat; Perkika
- Preceded by: Pakempalan Politik Katolik Djawi
- Merged into: Indonesian Democratic Party
- Headquarters: Solo (1945–1948); Jogjakarta (1948–1950); Jakarta (1950–)
- Newspaper: Suara Katolik; Kompas (1965–1971)
- Student wing: Union of Catholic University Students of the Republic of Indonesia
- Youth wing: Catholic Youth
- Ideology: Political Catholicism; Christian democracy Conservatism
- Political position: Centre-right to right-wing
- Religion: Christianity (Roman Catholicism)
- Slogan: Ad maiorem Dei gloriam

The Catholic Party of the Republic of Indonesia (Indonesian: Partai Katolik Republik Indonesia, PKRI), or simply known as the Catholic Party (Partai Katolik, PK), was a political party in the Dutch East Indies and later Indonesia for the Catholic community which existed from 1923 to 1973. In 1967 members were involved in debates concerning religious freedom in the New Order and the influence of missionaries on the nation. In the following decade it merged with other parties to form the Indonesian Democratic Party, which has since been renamed the Indonesian Democratic Vanguard Party.

== History ==
=== Pre-independence ===
The participation of Catholics in Indonesia begun in the 1920s. In 1923, Fredericus Soetrisno Harjadi, Ignatius Joseph Kasimo, and others formed the Javan Catholic Political Union (Javanese: Pakempalan Politik Katolik Djawi (PPKD)). In the political situation of the Dutch East Indies, PPKD joined itself with the Indische Katholieke Partij (IKP), a federation of Catholic organization in the Dutch East Indies, which was formed in November 1918. Even though PPKD was more oriented to Javanese nationalism, IKP itself was more oriented to the interests of the Dutch Catholics. This conflict of interest led PPKD to split from the IKP, and on 22 February 1925, PPKD transformed itself into a political party. Later, PPKD would transform its name into the Indonesian Catholic Political Union (Indonesian: Persatuan Politik Katolik Indonesia (PPKI)) .

Inside the Volksraad, PPKI and IKP were separated from each other. PPKI was located in the left group, a group of political parties in Volksraad consisting of Indonesians, while IKP was located in middle group, which consisted of Dutch. The left group would later form the Indonesian Political Federation in 1939.

During the Japanese occupation of the Dutch East Indies, PPKI was officially abolished by the Japanese. Even though the Japanese officially dissolved PPKI, the executive council of PPKI did not respond to the abolition, and PPKI went underground.

=== Independence ===
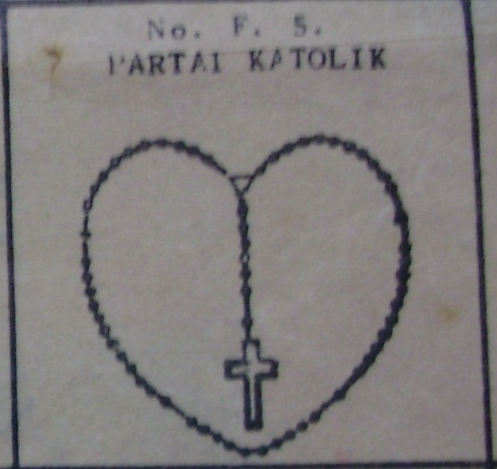
Partai Katolik on 1955 ballot paper

After the independence of Indonesia on 17 August 1945, Sukarno as the president of Indonesia formed the Central Indonesian National Committee (KNIP) twelve days later. I.J. Kasimo, the chairman of PPKI, was appointed as the member of KNIP. To formalize the representation of PPKI in the committee, PPKI changed its name to the Catholic Party of the Republic of Indonesia (Indonesian: Partai Katolik Republik Indonesia, PKRI) on 8 December 1945.

During the Indonesia National Revolution, the headquarters of the party was located in Surakarta. By the decision of the council on 11 July 1948, the headquarters was moved to Jogjakarta. In 1948, after the Dutch seized Jogjakarta, PKRI went underground, with its chairman, I.J. Kasimo, working in Sumatra due to his appointment as the Minister of Trade. Other figures from the party which had been appointed as minister are Fredericus Soetrisno Harjadi (as Minister of Social Affairs in the Natsir Cabinet) and Soewarto (as Minister of Agriculture in the Sukiman Cabinet and as Minister of Public Works in the Wilopo Cabinet). The underground hiding ended in the beginning of July 1949 when the Indonesian government returned to Yogyakarta.

From 7 until 12 December 1949, PKRI held the All-Indonesian Catholic Congress in Jogjakarta. The congress was attended by delegations from all over Indonesia. The congress discussed about the unity of the Catholic people in Indonesia. The congress also decided to unite all of the Catholic organizations in the United States of Indonesia at that time:

- Partai Katolik Republik Indonesia (P.K.R.I.) in Surakarta.
- Partai Katolik Rakyat Indonesia (P.K.R.I.) in Makassar.
- Partai Katolik Rakyat Indonesia (P.K.R.I.) in Flores.
- Partai Katolik Indonesia Timur (Parkit) in Timor.
- Persatuan Politik Katolik Flores (Perkokaf) in Flores.
- Permusyawaratan Majlis Katolik (Permakat) in Manado.
- Partai Katolik Indonesia Kalimantan (Parkika) in Kalimantan.

All of the delegations from the organizations agreed to merge into the Catholic Party, which was finalized on 12 December 1949. The first congress of the party was held in Semarang, from 4 until 6 August 1950, on which the Catholic Party decided to move its headquarters into Jakarta.

== Membership ==
Since 1949, Catholic party began to open its membership for non-pribumis, which was based on the decision about the citizenship system of Indonesia, which was established in the Round Table Conference. This decision was reinforced with the approval of the party's constitution in 1950, which stipulates that the terms of membership in the party is: at least 18 years old, a Catholic, and is the citizen of Indonesia. The decision makes the party boasted as one of the first organizations to accept Chinese members and members of European descent.

== Chairman ==
| Name | Photo | From | Until |
|---|---|---|---|
| Ignatius Joseph Kasimo | | 8 December 1945 | 25 July 1965 |
| Frans Seda | | 25 July 1965 | 16 December 1971 |
| Ben Mang Reng Say | | 16 December 1971 | 11 January 1973 |

== Election results ==
=== People's Representative Council ===
| Election | Party leader | Seats | Seat change | Votes | % of votes | Outcome of election |
|---|---|---|---|---|---|---|
| 1955 | Ignatius Joseph Kasimo | 6 / 257 | | 770,740 | 2.04% | Governing coalition |
| 1971 | Frans Seda | 3 / 360 | ▼3 | 603,740 | 1.10% | Governing coalition |

=== Constitutional Assembly ===
| Election | Party leader | Seats | Votes | % of votes | Bloc |
|---|---|---|---|---|---|
| 1955 | Johannes Leimena | 10 / 514 | 748,591 | 1.98% | Pancasila Bloc |

== See also ==
- Politics of Indonesia
