= Frans Seda =

Indonesian politician (1926–2009)

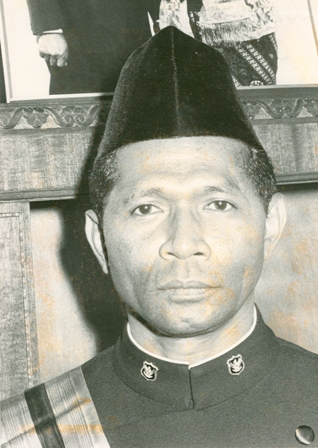

19th Minister of Transportation
- In office 6 June 1968 – 28 March 1973
- President: Suharto
- Preceded by: Jatidjan; Sutopo
- Succeeded by: Basuki Rachmat

14th Minister of Finance
- In office 25 July 1966 – 6 June 1968
- President: Sukarno; Suharto
- Preceded by: Sumarno
- Succeeded by: Ali Wardhana

13th Minister of Agriculture
- In office 24 February 1966 – 25 July 1966
- President: Sukarno
- Preceded by: Sadjarwo
- Succeeded by: Sutjipto

Personal details
- Born: Fransiscus Xaverius Seda; 4 October 1926 Maumere, East Nusa Tenggara, Dutch Indies
- Died: 31 December 2009 (aged 83) Jakarta, Indonesia

Franciscus Xaverius Seda (4 October 1926 – 31 December 2009), popularly known as Frans Seda, was an Indonesian finance minister in the early days of Suharto's presidency. He also served as a minister during the final days of Indonesia's founding President Sukarno's rule in 1966. He is one of the most well-known figures from the eastern province of Nusa Tenggara Timur.

He served as plantation minister from 1964 to 1966, agriculture minister in 1966, finance minister from 1966 to 1968 and transportation minister from 1968 to 1973. Seda was a former chairman of the Indonesian Catholic Party and a senior advisor to the Indonesian Democratic Party of Struggle (PDI-P) Party.

== Honours ==
=== National ===
- Star of Mahaputera (2nd Class) (Indonesian: Bintang Mahaputera Adipradana) (1973)

=== Foreign honours ===
- Australia:
  - Honorary Member of the Order of Australia (AM) (1999)
- Belgium:
  - Grand Cross of the Order of Leopold II (1970)
- Cambodia:
  - Grand Cross of the Royal Order of Sahametrei (1968)
- Holy See:
  - Knight Grand Cross of the Order of St. Sylvester (1964)
- Netherlands:
  - Knight Grand Cross of the Order of Orange-Nassau (1968)
