= Ashari Danudirdjo =

Indonesian sailor

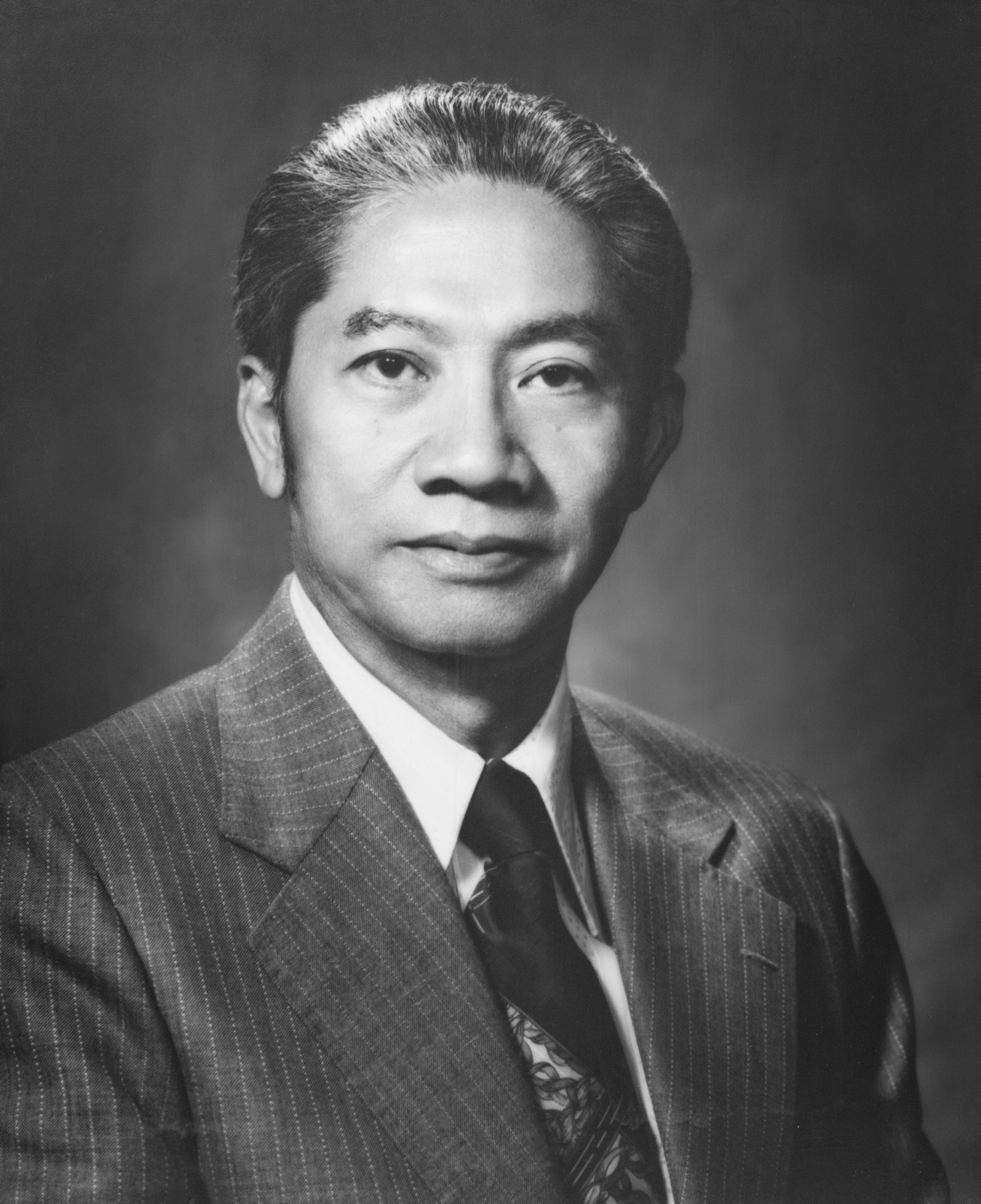

Personal information
- Nationality: Indonesian
- Born: 3 November 1922 Semarang, Dutch East Indies
- Died: 2 April 2010 (aged 87) Jakarta, Indonesia

Sport
- Sport: Sailing

Ashari Danudirdjo (3 November 1922 – 2 April 2010) was an Indonesian sailor. He competed in the Dragon event at the 1960 Summer Olympics. He later served as Minister of Textile Industry and Minister of Trade under Sukarno.
