= Rengasdengklok Incident =

1945 Indonesian kidnapping

The Rengasdengklok Incident (Indonesian: Peristiwa Rengasdengklok) was the kidnapping of Soekarno and Mohammad Hatta by several youths (pemuda) at around 4 am on August 16, 1945 to persuade the two men to declare Indonesian independence. It was the peak of the disagreements between the older and pemuda groups over how to carry out the proclamation of independence. After that they agreeing to write the script of the text at night and at the morning around 06-10 AM they finally read it

== Background ==
Following a decision by Field Marshall Hisaichi Terauchi, commander of the Southern Expeditionary Army Group, the Preparatory Committee for Indonesian Independence (Indonesian: Panitia Persiapan Kemerdekaan Indonesia, PPKI) was formed on August 7, 1945 "to hasten all efforts in relation to final preparations for forming a government of an independent Indonesia".

On August 14, pemuda figure Sutan Sjahrir told Indonesian nationalist Hatta about rumors that the Japanese were about to surrender and urged Hatta to declare independence without involving the PPKI, as this would result in the victorious Allies viewing Indonesia as a Japanese-sponsored state. However, Hatta wanted to avoid problems with the Japanese, as did the most prominent nationalist leader, Soekarno. The following day, Japan surrendered. Hatta then called a meeting on the PPKI for the following day, and went home to prepare a proclamation of independence.

=== Organising ===
According to Djamaluddin Tamin, among the pemuda activists who learned of reports that Japan was preparing to surrender was Adam Malik, who discussed the situation with Sukarni, Pandu Kartawiguna, Maroeto Nitimihardjo, and Chairul Saleh. The group initially intended to hold their discussions at Sukarni's house. On 14 August, however, Sukarni was visited by a man calling himself "Ilyas Hussein", the pseudonym then being used by Tan Malaka, whose true identity remained unknown to most of the Jakarta pemuda.

When Hussein arrived at Sukarni's house on 14 August, he discussed the political situation and proposed preparations centred on the mobilisation of the masses. Sukarni, who had long studied Tan Malaka's writings, later recalled that Hussein's arguments and political analysis closely resembled ideas in Tan Malaka's works. The resemblance left Sukarni uncertain about the stranger's identity; though strengthened his conviction that a proclamation of independence was imminent and inspired him to prepare for it. Sukarni, however, remained suspicious of Hussein. To the Jakarta pemuda, according to the analysis of Harry A. Poeze, his political knowledge, unusual manner of speech, and apparent familiarity with events outside Indonesia raised questions about who he actually was. In the atmosphere created by the Kempeitai's surveillance and use of informants, the possibility that Hussein was a Japanese agent provocateur could not readily be dismissed. Adam Malik remarked of Sukarni's reluctance to question Hussein openly or disclose the group's plans to a fear that the encounter might be a Japanese trap. Because of these suspicions, the confidential meeting that had been intended for Sukarni's house was moved elsewhere, to the residence of Maroeto Nitimihardjo near Djalan Bogor Lama.

During 15 August, reports of the Japanese surrender became increasingly certain. The event led to a broader gathering of pemuda activists later that day at the Bacteriology Institute in Pegangsaan Timur. Unlike the smaller discussion of the previous night, the meeting brought together activists from several youth circles and sought to establish a common position toward the proclamation. The group included Wikana, D. N. Aidit and Chairul Saleh. The participants conclude to the rejection of the involvement of the PPKI, believeing that independence should be proclaimed as an act of the Indonesian people rather than appear as the fulfilment of a Japanese promise, and resolved to press Sukarno and Hatta to proclaim independence immediately.

The group decided to send a delegation to urge Soekarno to declare independence as soon as possible. When the group arrived at Soekarno's house, there was a heated debate as Soekarno urged patience, saying he needed to consult the PPKI membership and that he did not want to provoke the Japanese. Hatta arrived later, and agreed with Soekarno, and the pemuda delegation left after a further exchange of angry words, with Wikana saying he could not be responsible for the consequences if independence was not declared on August 16 at noon.

== Kidnapping ==
In the early hours of the morning, at around 4am, a group led by Sukarni, took Soekarno and Hatta to Rengasdengklok, Karawang, ostensibly to protect them from a pemuda uprising. Initially, they were taken to the Defenders of the Homeland (PETA) dormitory in Rengasdengklok. Because this location was deemed unsafe, they were then moved to the house of a man named Djiauw Kie Siong. The two men were again urged to proclaim of the independence of Indonesia. Hatta and Soekarno, now convinced the Japanese had surrendered, still wanted a declaration to be representative of the whole country, and therefore thought that the PPKI should make it. They also wanted to be sure that the Japanese would not take any military action in response.

The purpose of the kidnappings as reported by the Indonesian Ministry of Education and Culture, were:

1. To urge Soekarno and Hatta to immediately convey the proclamation of Indonesian independence because at that time there was a vacuum of power due to Japan's surrender to the Allies.
2. To keep Soekarno and Hatta away from Japanese influence.
3. To show the proclamation as the struggle of the Indonesian people, that must be immediately formulated and read.
4. To prevent Indonesia from falling into the hands of the Allies because of the vacuum of power from the Japanese side in Indonesia.

== Release and return to Jakarta ==
On the morning of August 16, Navy liaison officer Admiral Maeda learned that Soekarno and Hatta had been kidnapped. The results of the search and investigation then led to the suspicion falling on Wikana, who was then urged to immediately return the two men to Jakarta. Achmad Soebardjo picked them up from Rengasdengklok after Admiral Maeda guaranteed their security and promised there would be no interference from Japan in the independence proclamation. Soekarno and Hatta reached Jakarta late that night, and after discussions, went to Maeda's house where they wrote a brief declaration, which Soekarno read at his house on the morning of August 17.
