= Sukarni =

Indonesian politician

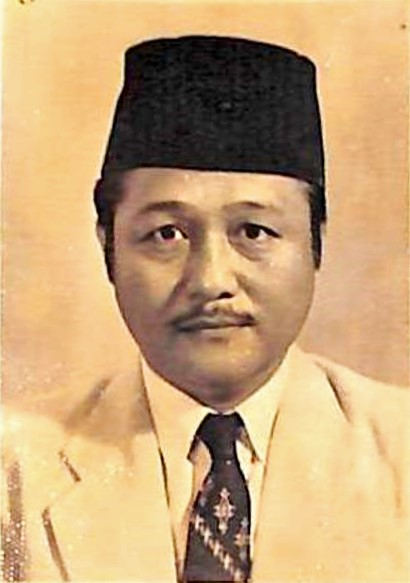
- Sukarni before 1959

3rd Indonesian Ambassador to the People's Republic of China
- In office 1961 – March 1964
- Preceded by: Sukarjo Wiryopranoto
- Succeeded by: Djawoto

Personal details
- Born: 14 July 1916 Blitar, Dutch East Indies
- Died: 7 May 1971 (aged 54) Jakarta, Indonesia
- Occupation: politician
- Awards: National Hero of Indonesia

Sukarni Kartodiwirjo (14 July 1916 – 7 May 1971) was an Indonesian freedom fighter and activist who demanded independence for Indonesia during the Dutch colonial era and the Japanese occupation, and was the chairman of the Murba Party until his death.

== Biography ==
Sukarni was born on 14 July 1916 in Sumberdiran, Garum, Blitar. The name Sukarni in Javanese means "to pay more attention". He was the fifth child of Dimun Kartodiwirjo, son of Prince Diponegoro's right-hand man Onggomerto, and Supiah, a woman from Kediri. Sukarni's older siblings were Hono, Sukarlim, Sukarmilah, Sukardi, while the younger siblings were Suparti, Endang Sarti, Endi Sukarto, Sukarjo, and an unnamed sibling who died as a child. Sukarni studied at Mardisiswo in Blitar, similar school to Taman Siswa that time. Sukarni continued to study at Hollandsch-Inlandsche School (HIS; Dutch school for natives). When Sukarni graduated from HIS and registered for Meer Uitgebreid Lager Onderwijs (MULO; secondary school), his father died in 1929. After graduating from MULO, Sukarni then continued his study to Kweekschool (teacher school) and Volks Universiteit (People University).

According to Emalia Iragiliati, Sukarni became a follower of Sukarno in Bandung when he was studying journalism, encouraged by Sukarno's elder sister, Wardoyo, in Blitar.

In 1930, Sukarni joined Perhimpunan Pemuda Pelajar Indonesia, which was later renamed to Indonesia Muda, and became the chairman of the Blitar section. He also joined Persatuan Pemuda Rakyat Indonesia (Perpri) section Purworejo. In 1933 he became the chairman of Indonesia Muda section Purworejo. Due to his activities in Indonesia Muda, Sukarni was expelled from MULO but he was allowed to take a special examination so he still graduated. Sukarni once created PPPI's rival, Persatuan Pemuda Kita because the former did not allow youths who had not attended school to join. After creating this, later both groups were merged and became Indonesia Muda. At the Indonesia Muda congress in Surabaya, Sukarni managed to persuade congress participants to approve his idea allowing youths that hadn't attended school to join Indonesia Muda. In 1934, he was appointed as the chairman of Pengurus Besar Indonesia Muda. Sukarni helped Anwari and elder sister of Sukarno, Wardoyo, to establish the Partindo Blitar chapter and for the first time met Wikana, Asmara Hadi, and SK Trimurti. At the end of 1935, Sukarni was appointed as chairman of the Perpri Jakarta section. In 1936, Sukarni translated Tan Malaka's brochures and pamphlets from Dutch to Indonesian and distributed them. He managed to escape the arrest of Indonesia Muda members in the head office in Jakarta on 19 June 1936. The colonial government searched for Sukarni due to his article in Indonesia Muda magazine encouraging youths to unite against colonialism.

Sukarni who was pursued by the government then decided to go to Borneo. He said goodbye to his mother in Blitar and entrusted the Indonesia Muda leadership to Ruslan Abdulgani. Sukarni lived in disguise under the name Maidi Borneo area from 1937 to 1940. He traveled to Banjarmasin, then moved to Murung Pudak working as coolie at Bataafse Petroleum Maatschappij (BPM). He then moved to Sangasanga and worked as servant at one of BPM official's houses. He subsequently moved to Balikpapan and served as a data recorder in the BPM topography department.

Sukarni eventually was arrested by the colonial government there before the Japanese attacked the Dutch East Indies - sometime in 1940 according to Husein Yusuf, while in disguise as the employee of the department of BPM. He was brought to Samarinda before being jailed in Java, which was chosen over Boven Digul because Japanese army had attacked the Dutch Indies. Sukarni was then brought to Jakarta via Surabaya. Sukarni initially was jailed in Pasar Baru prison. Sukarni was later released and lived with Antara staff.

Sukarni, as well as employees of Antara such as Adam Malik, A. M. Sipahoetar, Pandu Kartawiguna, and Abdul Hakim, and other activists such as Asmara Hadi, Mulia, Wasdji Kartawiganda, and Wikana were arrested in December 1941 because the Dutch colonial government considered them dangerous. At first they were jailed in Pasar Baru prison. They then moved to Sukabumi, then Garut then Sukabumi again. Before being transferred to Australia, they were then moved to Nusakambangan on 2 March 1942 and settled there. The transport ship in which they were deported, KPM Tawali, along with other ships docked there then were destroyed by Japanese attacks on 4 and 5 March. On 10th, all of the prisoners were set free including Sukarni, Adam Malik, and Wikana. On 15th, Sukarni and the others traveled to Maos by foot. They then crossed the Serayu River then walked again to Jeruklegi. There they went to Jakarta using train from Bandung. In this train, Sukarni met Nursjiar, his future wife.

In Jakarta, Sukarni worked for several news agencies such as Antara, which was later replaced by Dōmei Tsushin and Sendenbu (the Japanese occupation of the Dutch East Indies's propaganda department). During this time, according to Adam Malik, and according to Emalia Iragiliati that time was 1942, Sukarni married Nursjiar. Sukarni and the other young men worked in Sendenbu and other Japanese office to infiltrate and find information.

Sukarni persuaded chairman of Perhimpunan Pelajar-Pelajar Indonesia Chairul Saleh and chairman of Baperpi Supeno to establish an educational institution for Indonesian young men. At the end of 1942 the Ashrama (Note: According to Khalid Rasjidi, ashrama at that time meant "political educational institution", not like the word asrama in modern Indonesian, which means dormitory.) Angkatan Baru or Ashrama Pemuda at Menteng 31 was founded and aided by Sendenbu. In 1943, the first two were responsible for organizing the institution as chairman and vice chairman respectively helped by A.M. Hanafi as secretary and I. Wiejaja as treasurer.

In this period, Sukarni also had some connection to Tan Malaka who worked at a Japanese factory in Bayah, Banten, at the time. Sukarni had been visited by Tan Malaka using the alias Husin, which Sukarni did not know. They discussed politics for a day before Husin visited other activists such as Chairul Saleh and Tjokroaminoto, who Husin had not met, and Achmad Subardjo.

Sukarni became a father in 1943 after Nursjiar gave birth Luhantara, their first son. A year later, they had another son, Kumalakanta. Sukarni, Chairul Saleh, Adam Malik, Pandu Kartawiguna, and Maruto Nitimihardjo worked for Sendenbu under Mohamad Yamin in 1943, while Sukarni and Chairul Saleh worked until June 1945.

Sukarni took part in the Kongres Pemuda meeting held between 16 and 18 May 1945 in Villa Isola, Bandung. The desire of the young men for Indonesian independence increased after the meeting, especially in Java. In that year, Sukarni was also the chairman of the Committee van Actie Menteng 31.

On 3 June 1945, Sukarni and 32 other young men held a meeting at Gedung Gambir Selatan. The result of the meeting was the appointment of 10 committee members led by B.M. Diah and Sukarni, Soediro, Sjarif Thajeb, Harsono Tjokroaminoto, Wikana, Chairul Saleh, Gultom, Supeno, and Asmara Hadi, who were responsible for discussing the formation of Gerakan Angkatan Baru Indonesia which was founded on 15 June.

Sometimes in Preparatory Committee for Indonesian Independence (PPKI) meetings, the youth had some problem with the older generation. Sukarni and Chairul Saleh were transferred due to this.

Ashrama 31 was then dissolved on 15 August 1945 immediately after the Japanese army. The activists from various youth groups then formed the Committee van Actie headed by Sukarni, Chairul Saleh and Wikana as vice-chairmen, and Adam Malik, Pandu Kartawiguna, Maruto Nitimihardjo, Djohar Nur, Darwis, A.M. Hanafi, and Armunanto as members.

At Sukarno's house on the night of 15 August, young men urged him to declare the independence of Indonesia. According to Sukarno in his autobiography, Sukarni was there urging him, but according to Sukarni, that time he was at Cikini 71 waiting the result of the discussion. The young men didn't want the independence as a present from Japanese. During the wait, Sukarni, dr Muwardi, Dr. Sutjipto, Chairul Saleh, Wikana, Jusuf Kunto, and the others planned the abduction of Sukarno-Hatta. Sukarni talked to Sukarno supporting the other young men's argument to declare independence when they began the abduction at dawn on the 16th.

Sukarni, Singgih, Muwardi, and Jusuf Kunto took Sukarno and Hatta to Rengasdengklok while Wikana and Chairul Saleh waited in Jakarta. Latief Hendraningrat from Pembela Tanah Air (PETA) borrowed the youths' military uniforms and pistols to fool Japanese soldiers. Sukarni and Kunto went with Hatta, while Sukarno, his wife Fatmawati, and their son Guntur traveled in another car. They arrived in Jakarta in the evening the same day after Achmad Subardjo followed them and managed to persuade the young men to go home.

Sukarno and Hatta were brought to Rear Admiral Maeda's house. Sukarni stated that he already prepared the revolt in several places in Jakarta. Maeda disagreed with the revolt because it was more dangerous than a proclamation. Sukarni, accompanied by Sayuti Melik and Maeda's subordinate Nishijima, then informed the people that were ready to cancel the revolt.

Sukarni and the other young men were at the house, now the Formulation of Proclamation Text Museum, during the writing of the proclamation manuscript. Sukarni advised the others to choose only Sukarno and Hatta to sign the declaration instead of all people who were there that time.

After the Central Indonesian National Committee (KNIP) was given the authority as the legislative on 17 October, Sukarni demanded the reform of the organization and appointed Sjahrir as the chairman instead of Kasman Singodimedjo and as the formateur of the KNIP Working Group In November, Sukarni joined the Chairul Saleh-led Badan Kongres Pemuda in Yogyakarta.

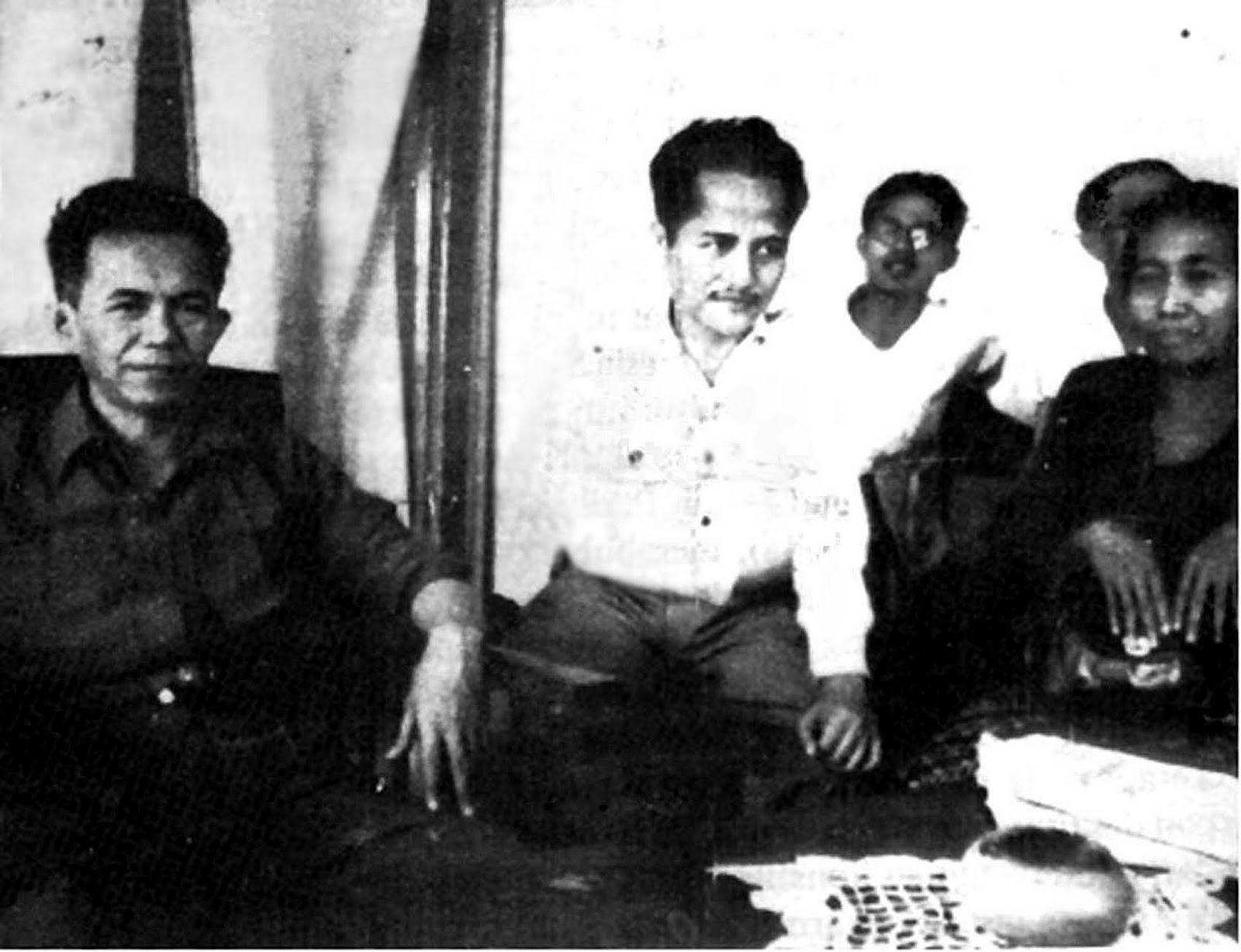
Tan Malaka, Sukarni, and Sri Mangunsarkoro.

In 1946, Sukarni's third child, Parialuti Indarwati, was born. On 31 March 1946, Persatuan Perdjuangan leaders were arrested by government authorities ordered by Sjahrir including Tan Malaka, secretary general Sukarni, and Sayuti Melik. In 1947, Sukarni was imprisoned in Ponorogo prison, Madiun, along with Tan Malaka, Moh. Yamin, and Ahmad Subardjo. Sukarni and Tan Malaka were then transferred to Magelang prison. They were released in September 1948 from the prison.

In November 1948, Sukarni was elected as chairman of Murba Party in the first congress mainly suggested by Tan Malaka. Mainly Sukarni-led Murba opposed the government policies especially Linggarjati, Renville, and KMB, except the decree reimposing 1945 Constitution.

Sukarni managed to escape from Yogyakarta down the Code River after the second military aggression was started. Sukarni and the other traveled to Imogiri then Gunungkidul escaping from Dutch army. Outside Yogyakarta, Sukarni helped Lieutenant Colonel Suharto carrying out guerrilla attacks. During these time, Sukarni strangely disguised under the name Suharto.

In 1949, Nursjiar gave birth to her fourth child, Goos Murbantoro. In 1952, Sukarni and Husein Yusuf traveled to Balikpapan to meet former old friends at work at BPM. In 1953, Sukarni's last child, Emalia Iragiliati was born in Yogyakarta.

After the general election in 1955, Sukarni was appointed as a member of legislature.

Sukarni was appointed by Sukarno as ambassador to the People's Republic of China mid 1960. The leadership of Murba was passed to Wasid Suwarto. Sukarni then returned in March 1964.

After Indonesian's foreign diplomacy was inclined to Peking and communism, Sukarni was arrested on 5 January 1965 charged with sedition and attempting to assassinate Sukarno using the Badan Pendukung Sukarnoisme, while according to Hasyim Darif, Sukarni was arrested because of his action against the Communist Party of Indonesia (PKI). According to A. Hamzah Tuppu, Sukarno was provoked by Aidit. He was detained in the detention center in Attorney General's office. After the transition to New Order, in 1966 Sukarni was released.

Sukarni became the chairman of Murba after the party had been prohibited during Sukarni's detention. When a rumor spread that Sukarno was about to be brought before a military court, Sukarni asked Hamzah Tuppu personally to prevent it. Sukarni reasoned that if Sukarno was imprisoned, the republic would end because it had no dignity mentioning a detainee every year in the independence celebration.

Sukarni was elected as 4th Chairman of Dewan Harian Nasional of Angkatan '45 after its first congress in April (pp. 258–9, according to Mayjen. M. Jasin) or September 1966 in Gelora Senayan. Sukarni was then involved in Delegasi '45 along with other Angkatan '45 to persuade Sukarno to disband the PKI to avoid civil war.

In 1967, Sukarni became a member of the Supreme Advisory Council.

In 1970, Sukarni and Rasjidi were involved in Musyawarah Besar Angkatan '45 in Berastagi, North Sumatera.

Several times in 1971, Sukarni was admitted to Cipto Mangunkusumo Hospital.

Before the 1971 general election, Sukarni persuaded other social and political elements to join Murba. On 5 May 1971, Sukarni requested Darif to write his general election campaign speech when they met in the evening that day. Two days later on the morning of 7 May, Sukarni died in Jakarta. His remains were buried in Taman Makam Pahlawan Kalibata.

== Political views ==
Sukarni considered the Investigating Committee for Preparatory Work for Independence (BPUPK) to be dominated by older Indonesians and the Preparatory Committee for Indonesian Independence (PPKI) by Japanese military-backed old activists.

According to Hasyim Darif, Sukarni was influenced by Sukarno mainly during the underground activities against the Dutch colonial government and Japanese military government when the two met and discussed politics, but Sukarni was against Sukarno during the National Revolution. Sukarni was also influenced by Tan Malaka during the Dutch and Japanese era through Tan Malaka's writings. Tan Malaka influenced Sukarni both political theory and practices during National Revolution. Both of them opposed the Indonesian government compromising with the Dutch including when concluding the Linggadjati Agreement, the Renville agreement, and the Round Table Conference. Khalid Rasjidi described Sukarni as "the most loyal and most trusted Tan Malaka's disciple." After Sukarno declared the Nasakom philosophy, Sukarni was against PKI political activities.

Moh. Padang stated that "Murba was Sukarni, Sukarni was Murba; without Sukarni Murba didn't exist."

Iragiliati citing Sukarni, said that Indonesian murba (musyawarah rakyat banyak; deliberation of common people) is different than western version. Indonesian version prioritizes family relationship.

Roeslan Abdulgani described the political view of Sukarni as "radical-revolutionary" while his way of life was "filled with the soul of democracy".

== Legacy ==
Sukarni was posthumously awarded the Bintang Maha Putera IV medal. According to the Emalia Iragiliati, youngest daughter of Sukarni, Sukarni was able to speak Javanese, Indonesian, Dutch, German, and Japanese.

An exhibition about Sukarni and GSSJ Ratulangie was held from 6 until 30 August 2009 in the Formulation of Proclamation Text Museum, Jakarta.

On 7 November 2014, the government of Indonesia made Sukarni a National Hero along with Djamin Ginting, Mohamad Mangundiprojo, and Abdul Wahab Chasbullah through Presidential Decree No. 115/TK/2014.

== Bibliography ==
- Muljana, Slamet (2008). Kesadaran Nasional dari Kolonialisme Sampai Kemerdekaan. Vol. 2. Yogyakarta: LKiS. ISBN 9789791283571.
- Mustoffa, Sumono, ed. (1986). Sukarni dalam Kenangan Teman-Temannya. Jakarta: Sinar Harapan. OCLC 558086457.
- Suhartono (2007). Kaigun, Angkatan Laut Jepang, Penentu Krisis Proklamasi. Yogyakarta: Kanisius. ISBN 9789792117394.
- Sukarni, Emalia Iragiliati (2013). Sukarni & Actie Rengasdengklok. Yogyakarta: Ombak. ISBN 9786022580164.
