= Ichiki Tatsuo =

- 市来龍雄
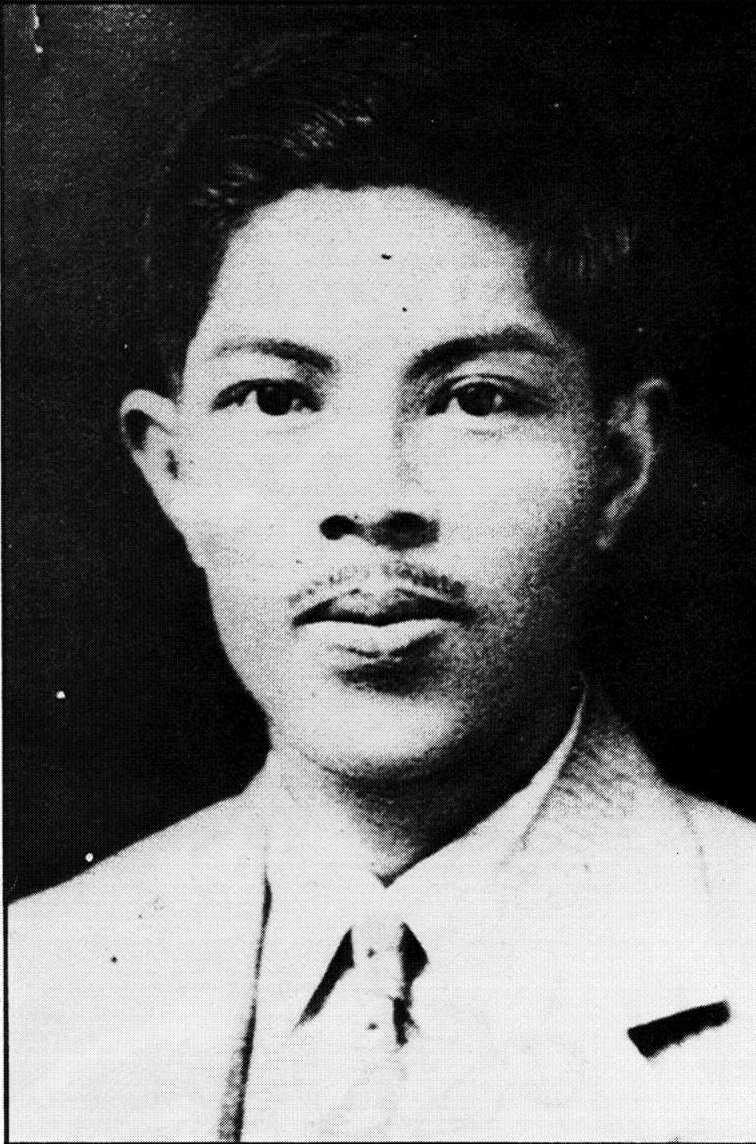
- Ichiki Tatsuo in 1941
- Born: 1906; Kumamoto Prefecture, Japan
- Died: 9 January 1949 (aged 42–43); Malang Regency, State of East Java, Dutch East Indies
- Known for: Defecting to Indonesia during the Indonesian National Revolution

Ichiki Tatsuo (市来龍夫) (1906 – 9 January 1949) was a Japanese journalist who defected to Indonesia and participated in the Indonesian National Revolution.

Born in Kumamoto, Tatsuo went to the Dutch East Indies at the age of 21 and worked in multiple jobs before becoming involved politically. After being unable to return to Indonesia, he became a propagandist during the Japanese invasion, during which he showed clear sympathies for the independence movement. During the Indonesian National Revolution, he joined the Indonesian guerilla fighters and fought the Dutch forces and was killed in action during Operation Kraai.

== Early life ==
Ichiki Tatsuo was born in a small town named Taraki in Kumamoto Prefecture of Southern Kyushu in 1906. He was the third of six children and while the family were poor, was a descendant of medieval feudal lords. His parents divorced during his childhood and Tatsuo's mother adopted Catholicism, with Tatsuo being baptized at age 5 and receiving the baptismal name Sebastian. He grew up during the transition from the more democratic Taishō era to the totalitarian early Shōwa era.

== Life in Indonesia ==
=== Pre-war ===
In 1927, at the age of 21, Tatsuo left his middle school and began training as a photographer in Ōita Prefecture. Soon afterwards, he moved to Palembang following an invitation from a friend to work in a photo studio owned by Miyahata Seiichi, one leader of the Palembang Japanese community. Throughout his time in the city, he would write letters to his mother describing the Indonesians as "lazy" and the Chinese community there as "dirty". Eventually, however, he adopted Indonesian habits and made friends with locals.

After 6 years in Palembang, Tatsuo moved to Bandung in Java in 1933 to work at a different photo studio. His brother Naohiro, who followed him to Palembang, had gone there earlier, but died in Bandung. However, he left the studio in under a year. He then found employment as a bus conductor, but before long left the job and stayed with Iti, a local woman whose family lived in the nearby town of Sumedang. During this time, he worked on a Japanese-Indonesian dictionary, translated Japanese articles for local newspapers, and kept himself updated on the political situation back in Japan.

As Tatsuo was in contact with Indonesian nationalist leaders, he became a target of surveillance from Dutch authorities following the increase of tensions between the countries in the buildup to the Pacific War. In August 1938, Tatsuo went to Tokyo to discuss a publication project he planned, but was not allowed to return to Java due to his involvement in an affair where the Japanese attempted to purchase a newspaper to counter anti-Japanese coverage. Due to this, he proceeded to obtain part-time employment in the Japanese Foreign Ministry as a research staff member. During his time back in Japan, he married a distant cousin living in Tokyo.

=== Japanese occupation ===
By 1941, relations between Japan and the western countries had deteriorated further, with embargoes against Japan and increased talk of a war in the south. Tatsuo became involved in preparations for an invasion of Java, being attached to the propaganda group of the Sixteenth Army on December. Following the successful invasion, the military Japanese authorities enforced tight political restrictions against Indonesian independence, which disappointed Indonesian nationalist leaders and Japanese sympathizers such as Tatsuo. On one occasion, Tatsuo wrote "Long Live Indonesia", an Indonesian nationalist song which was performed during a "Greater East Asian Culture Association" founding ceremony – in violation of the ban on such songs. Prior to the invasion, Tatsuo had participated in a choir singing "Indonesia Raya" conducted by Kosaku Yamada.

During the Japanese occupation, Tatsuo worked on translating Japanese army manuals to Indonesian and edited a magazine for the auxiliary Indonesian troops. For some time, he was also editor-in-chief of the Indonesian language paper Asia Raya. In addition, he also translated in official events and proposed the creation of an Indonesian language development committee, and later became part of it alongside nationalist leaders such as Sukarno and Hatta. With Sukarno and Achmad Subarjo, Tatsuo also became the only Japanese member of the advisory board for the Center for Indonesian Arts (Poesat Kesenian Indonesia) founded by Indonesian nationalists. He also became an adviser to the education department for the volunteer army PETA, during which Agus Salim gave him the nickname Abdul Rachman for Tatsuo's pro-Indonesian leanings.

=== Revolution ===
Following the surrender of Japan and the subsequent Proclamation of Indonesian Independence, Tatsuo visited a former training chief at PETA and asked to join the movement, although he was initially rejected. He later visited another officer and noted that he would not be returning to Japan, asking the officer to inform Tatsuo's wife.

After his defection, Tatsuo summarized and translated the Japanese Army's tactics handbook to Indonesian, and became an adviser at the new army's intelligence school. In the revolutionary armed forces, he helped in the establishment of a Japanese unit in the Indonesian National Armed Forces, and he was placed in command of a guerilla detachment consisting of Japanese defectors (named Zanryu Nihon-hei i.e. "Japanese soldiers who stayed behind"). He was active in East Java, namely to intercept Dutch troops in the road between Malang and Lumajang. The detachment also contained other non-soldiers such as Tomegoro Yoshizumi, who died in 1948.

== Death ==
Tatsuo was killed on the front lines, in the village of Arjosari to the southeast of Malang, during the surprise offensive Operation Kraai conducted by the Dutch on 9 January 1949. He was shot in the forehead: according to testimonies from his comrades, Tatsuo had charged towards the Dutch soldiers in what appeared to be an attempt to motivate the guerrilla fighters.

Following his death, during a 1958 visit to Japan, Sukarno delivered a letter to Shigetada Nishijima as a tribute for Tatsuo and Yoshizumi. A small monument was then erected at Seisho-ji temple of Minato, Tokyo, with the following inscription:

Inscription at Soekarno-hi, Seisho-ji temple
Kepada sdr. Ichiki Tatsuo dan sdr. Yoshizumi Tomegoro. Kemerdekaan bukanlah milik suatu bangsa saja, tetapi milik semua manusia. Tokyo, 15 Februari 1958. Soekarno. (original)	To brothers Ichiki Tatsuo and Yoshizumi Tomegoro. Independence does not belong to just one nation, but it belongs to all mankind. Tokyo, February 15, 1958 Soekarno. (translated)
