= Shigetada Nishijima =

Scholar

Shigetada Nishijima (西嶋重忠) (4 June 1911 – 9 December 2006) was a Japanese scholar, former spy and lobbyist. He was active in Indonesia before, during and after the Japanese occupation of the Dutch East Indies, and became a major figure on the Japanese side of the Indonesian National Revolution. Between the 1950s and the 1960s, he was a lobbyist and an intermediary, linking Japanese and Indonesian interests. Later on, he became a scholar of and published memoirs of his time in Indonesia.

== Early life ==
Nishijima was born on 4 June 1911. According to him, he was expelled from his high school due to his socialist leanings, and he worked at an ice factory until 1937 when he moved to the Dutch East Indies. Moreover, in an interview Nishijima remarked that his political leanings resulted in him being arrested three times in the 1930s, with two years' imprisonment after his third arrest. He had also studied German in Tokyo.

== Career ==
After being recruited by the Japanese Naval Intelligence to study Japanese influence in the South Seas, he arrived in the Dutch East Indies in July 1937. Between 1937 and 1941, Nishijima lived in Jakarta and Bandung, where he worked at a Japanese trading company's chain of department stores. By 1941, he was hired by Rear Admiral Tadashi Maeda as a naval spy. During his time working in the Indies, he established contacts and connections with Indonesian nationalists. When the Pacific War broke, Nishijima was arrested on December 8, 1941, and along with some 1,700 Japanese nationals, was detained by Dutch authorities and interned in Loveday, South Australia.

=== Japanese occupation ===
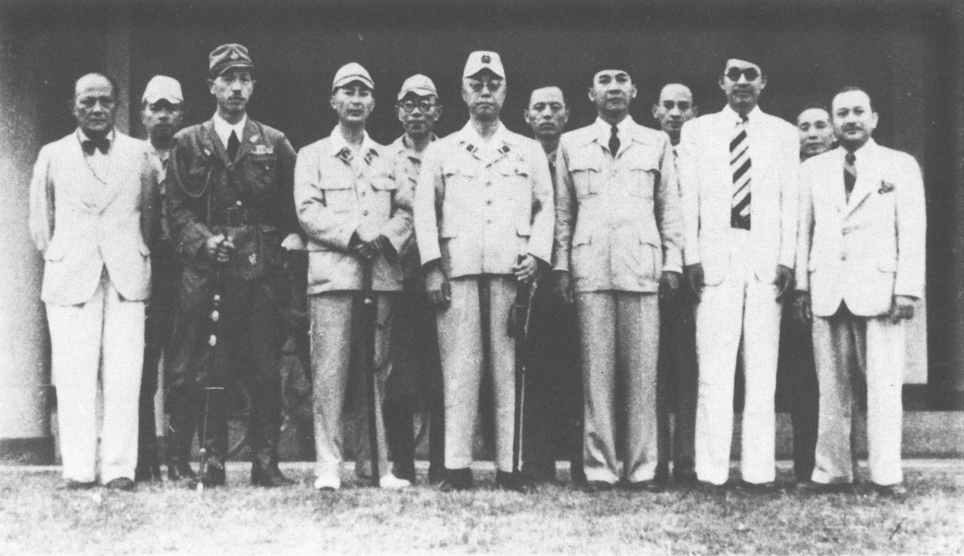
Nishijima (back row, third from right) during Sukarno's visit to Makassar in 1945.

After the Japanese invasion of the Dutch East Indies, Nishijima was repatriated in 1942 (alongside 834 other internees in a prisoner exchange) and was sent to Java. Dutch security forces failed to identify Nishijima as a naval spy, as he was listed as a businessman in the Dutch intelligence documents.

Nishijima then worked with the Japanese Navy Liaison Office in Jakarta, where he reestablished his contacts with Indonesian nationalists such as Achmad Soebardjo, who had worked with the office in New Guinea relating to maps and topics. Following Kuniaki Koiso's promise of Indonesian independence in 1944, Maeda sponsored the school Asrama Indonesia Merdeka (a school intended to train future Indonesian leaders), with Nishijima and his fellow Japanese agent Tomegorō Yoshizumi acting as Maeda's assistants.

=== Revolution ===
After the surrender of Japan, Nishijima was sent to locate Sukarno and Mohammad Hatta (who were missing from Jakarta, as they were kidnapped by nationalist youths and held in Rengasdengklok). He managed to convince Wikana to return both leaders to Jakarta. He was then assigned to help Indonesian nationalists Sukarni and Sayuti Melik ensure the more radical pemuda did not cause issues during the negotiations between the nationalist leaders and the Japanese occupation force, primarily to stop interference from Japanese guards.

He then participated in a meeting at Maeda's house when the Indonesian Proclamation of Independence was drafted, and with his help copies of the text were printed by the Naval Office' press. He was arrested as a war criminal by December 1946, but was released and returned to Japan.

=== Post-1949 ===
After a rejection of his visa in 1951 due to "official sensitivity", Nishijima returned to Indonesia in March 1953 in order to meet Sukarno to discuss war reparations. Discovering Japan's poor image in Indonesian media, he mediated for Aiichirō Fujiyama to sponsor and invite Indonesian journalists to visit Tokyo – which included Rosihan Anwar, Mochtar Lubis and Adam Malik. Nishijima built relations with Adam Malik in particular, and in a 2005 interview former CIA agent Clyde McAvoy noted that Nishijima was a vital intermediary between him and Malik (which involved funding anti-communist groups following the 30 September Movement).

In 1958, Nishijima met Pertamina chief Ibnu Sutowo, and through negotiations helped establish relations between the oil company and the Japanese "Kobayashi Group" (coordinated by industrialist Ataru Kobayashi), which eventually culminated in the formation of Nosodeco to exploit oilfields in North Sumatra. Nishijima, alongside Maeda, were also involved in negotiating oil contracts in West Papua following the conclusion of the West New Guinea dispute.

Nishijima later became a leader and pioneer at the Indonesian Study Group of Waseda University, which published works related to the Japanese military administration of Indonesia. Though the research topic was largely neglected during the 1960s and early 1970s, Japanese scholars who were part of the research group was given more attention by the late 1970s and 1980s. The Indonesia ni okeru Nippon Gunsei no Kenkyu (Study of Japanese Military Administration in Indonesia) was published in 1959, and his works and memoirs was donated to Waseda in 1971, compiled, and published in 1973 as "The Nishijima Collection". He gave an interview for the Kompas newspaper in October 2000, as likely the last living witness of the formulation of the proclamation text. He died at the age of 95, on 9 December 2006.

== Legacy ==
Australian historian Greg Poulgrain remarked that "whoever in Washington authorized the return of Nishijima and his compatriots [to Indonesia] should also be seen as having contributed to Indonesian independence". Nishijima was received with a hero's treatment during his visit to Jakarta in 1991. During a 1958 visit by Sukarno to Japan, he gave Nishijima a letter meant to be a tribute to other Japanese agents Ichiki Tatsuo and Tomegorō Yoshizumi, both of whom died during the Indonesian National Revolution.

== Bibliography ==
- Anderson, Benedict (2006). Java in a Time of Revolution: Occupation and Resistance, 1944–1946. Equinox Publishing. ISBN 9789793780146.
- Poulgrain, Greg (1993). "The Loveday Exchange, Australia, 1942: The Japanese Naval Spies Return to Java" (PDF). Indonesia. 55 (55): 141–149. doi:10.2307/3351090. hdl:1813/53999. ISSN 0019-7289. JSTOR 3351090. Archived from the original (PDF) on July 22, 2018.
