= Tomegorō Yoshizumi =

- 吉住 留五郎
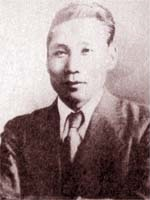
- Born: 9 February 1911; Oizumi-mura, Nishitagawa, Yamagata, Empire of Japan
- Died: 8 October 1948 (aged 37); Blitar, East Java, Dutch East Indies
- Citizenship: Japanese
- Occupations: Journalist, Spy
- Employer: Imperial Japanese Navy
- Known for: Defecting to Indonesia during the Indonesian National Revolution

Tomegorō Yoshizumi (吉住 留五郎, Yoshizumi Tomegorō; 9 February 1911 – 10 August 1948) was a Japanese spy and journalist who defected to Indonesia during the National Revolution. Born in Tōhoku region during the late stages of the Meiji period, in his early twenties he joined the Japanese expatriate community in the Dutch East Indies. Yoshizumi recruited locals for the Japanese spy ring in Java and Sulawesi, while also taking up employment for local Japanese newspapers. He was a noted follower of Japanese nationalism, and reportedly endorsed a "new order in East Asia". Although a civilian, he was inducted into the Imperial Japanese Navy, earning an officer's rank.

Deported from Java following the start of World War II, Yoshizumi returned illegally and was arrested in 1941, when Japan declared war on the Netherlands. He spent time in an Australian internment camp, but was released during a prisoner exchange in August 1942, and returned to the East Indies, which were by then under Japanese occupation. Although serving as head of the Japanese intelligence board Kaigun Bukanfu, by 1945 he embraced Indonesian nationalism and Marxism. He ensured that Sukarno and Muhammad Hatta signed their names to the Proclamation of Indonesian Independence, which he also helped write. Yoshizumi then joined Tan Malaka's network of anti-Dutch guerrillas, taking part as a soldier in the clashes of East Java. These activities inaugurated his participation in the National Revolution, which ended with his death from lung disease in 1948.

== Biography ==
Yoshizumi was born in Oizumi-mura, Nishitagawa District, Yamagata, on 9 February 1911. He studied in Tsuruoka. He first went to the Dutch East Indies in 1932, where he worked at a brothel to recruit native Javanese officials as Japanese agents. Outside of Java, Yoshizumi also networked with Minahasan people of Sulawesi. His early contributions to journalism included working as reporter for the Nichiran Shōgyō Shinbun, which employed him in 1935. Later, Yoshizumi was tasked with becoming a spy in Dutch East Indies by posing as a worker in Toko San'yo, a Japanese shop. He later founded Tōindo Nippō, a newspaper which combined Nichiran Shōgyō Shinbun and Jawa Nippō, in order to unite Japanese people in the Dutch East Indies. Although working for the Imperial Japanese Navy, Yoshizumi was not a career member, and was instead an attached civilian promoted to an officer.

Following the outbreak of World War II, Yoshizumi publicly advocated a "campaign for the new order in East Asia", which caused him to be deported. He returned clandestinely and was arrested again in December 1941, when war broke out between the Netherlands and Japan. He was detained in January 1942 and sent to a detainee camp in Loveday, South Australia. During his stay there, the East Indies were conquered by Japan and placed under a military regime. Yoshizumi was finally repatriated in August, following a prisoner exchange.

During 1945, while serving as a chief of the Japanese Imperial Navy Communications Office (Japanese: 海軍, romanized: kaigun bukanfu) under Admiral Tadashi Maeda, Yoshizumi secretly aligned with Indonesian nationalism. According to statements by his friend, Shigetada Nishijima, he had actually adopted Marxism, having previously been a supporter of right-wing Japanese nationalism. On 16 August 1945, prominent nationalist leaders Sukarno and Muhammad Hatta were kidnapped and brought to Rengasdengklok, Karawang by some other figures in the movement to be convinced to declare Indonesian independence, and afterwards Yoshizumi was sent to accompany them back, to ensure that the military would not interfere. Later, he would help to compose the text of the proclamation itself. Yoshizumi met Tan Malaka in Achmad Soebardjo's house shortly after the proclamation. He then deserted his post and aligned with Indonesia when he joined with Tan Malaka's group, where he was called Arif. He arrived there with stolen Japanese Navy resources, which went into funding Tan Malaka's guerrilla movement.

During the uprising, Yoshizumi was largely involved with independence movements in East Java. He died from lung problems as a guerrilla fighter at a mountain near Blitar on 10 August 1948. He was buried at the Taman Makam Pahlawan of that city.

Yoshizumi's story was recounted in a book by historian Wenri Wanhar, titled Jejak intel Jepang: kisah pembelotan Tomegoro Yoshizumi ("Japanese Spy Saga: the Story of Tomegoro Yoshizumi's Desertion"). Following his death, during a 1958 visit to Japan, Sukarno delivered a letter to Shigetada Nishijima as a tribute for Yoshizumi and Ichiki Tatsuo (another Japanese who defected to Indonesia). A small monument was then erected at Seisho-ji temple of Minato, Tokyo, with the following inscription:

Inscription at Soekarno-hi, Seisho-ji temple
Kepada sdr. Ichiki Tatsuo dan sdr. Yoshizumi Tomegoro. Kemerdekaan bukanlah milik suatu bangsa saja, tetapi milik semua manusia. Tokyo, 15 Februari 1958. Soekarno. (original)	To brothers Ichiki Tatsuo and Yoshizumi Tomegoro. Independence does not belong to just one nation, but it belongs to all mankind. Tokyo, 15 February 1958 Soekarno. (translated)
