= Sri Mangunsarkoro =

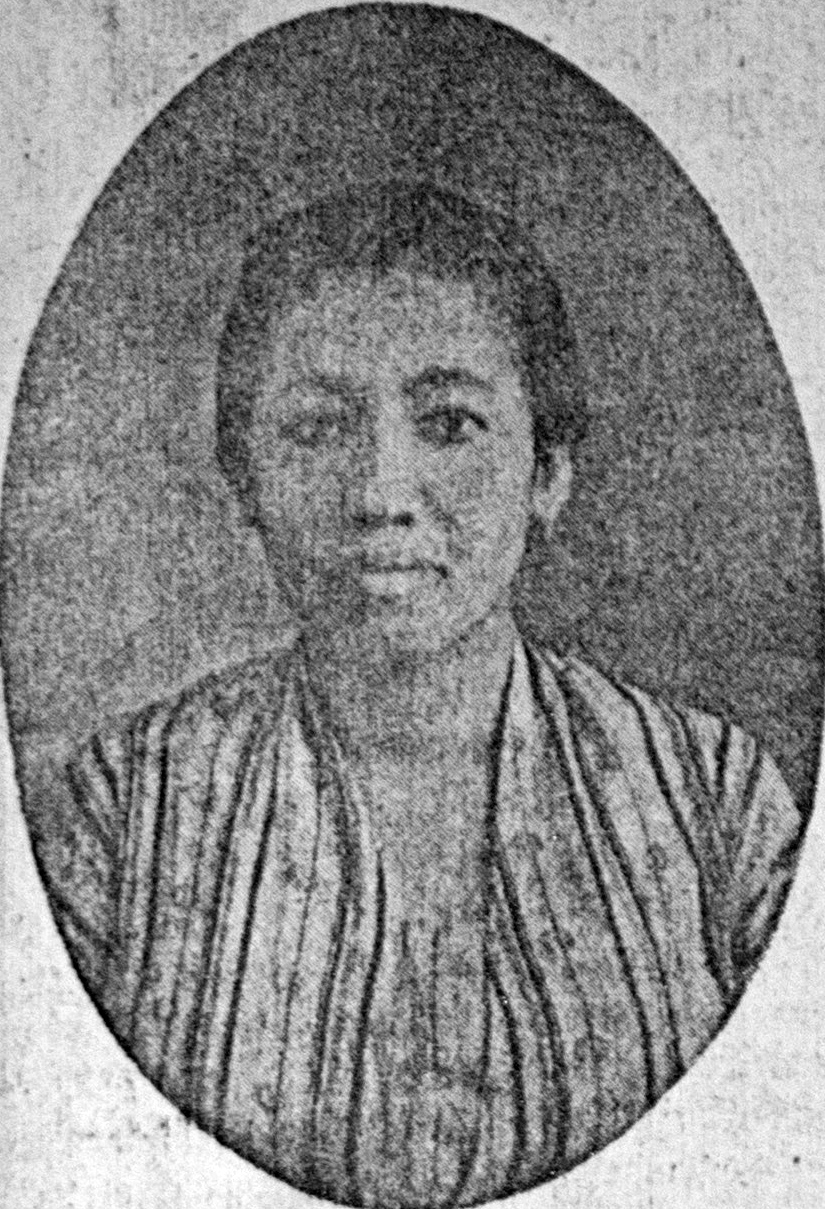
Sri Mangunsarkoro

Sri Mangunsarkoro was an Indonesian emancipation fighter, educator, and a pioneering leader in the national women's movement. She was the first chair of the Indonesian Women's Association (Perwari). Sri Mangunsarkoro succeeded in establishing Perwari as a vocal organization advocating for women's rights in marriage through a liberal-feminist implementation.

Perwari focused its efforts on establishing regulations to ensure greater justice for women within marriage, including provisions on monogamy, a minimum age for marriage, equal terms in divorce, property and inheritance rights, and the respective rights and obligations of husbands and wives. Under Sri Mangunsarkoro's leadership, Perwari also actively organized public forums, petitions, street demonstrations, and delegations to the government to advance its agenda. Innitially, she was a critic for Tan Malaka's ideals; however, she would later become a student and follower of Tan Malaka.

Before becoming chair of Perwari, Sri Mangunsarkoro had already been active in initiating and leading various women's movements and organizations. These included leading the handicrafts section of the Salatiga branch of Jong Java's women's division, serving as chair of Jong Java's women's division in 1920, chair of the Jakarta branch of Wanita Taman Siswa, chair of the Second Indonesian Women's Congress in Jakarta in 1935, and chair of the Indonesian Women's Labour Investigation Board (BPPPI).

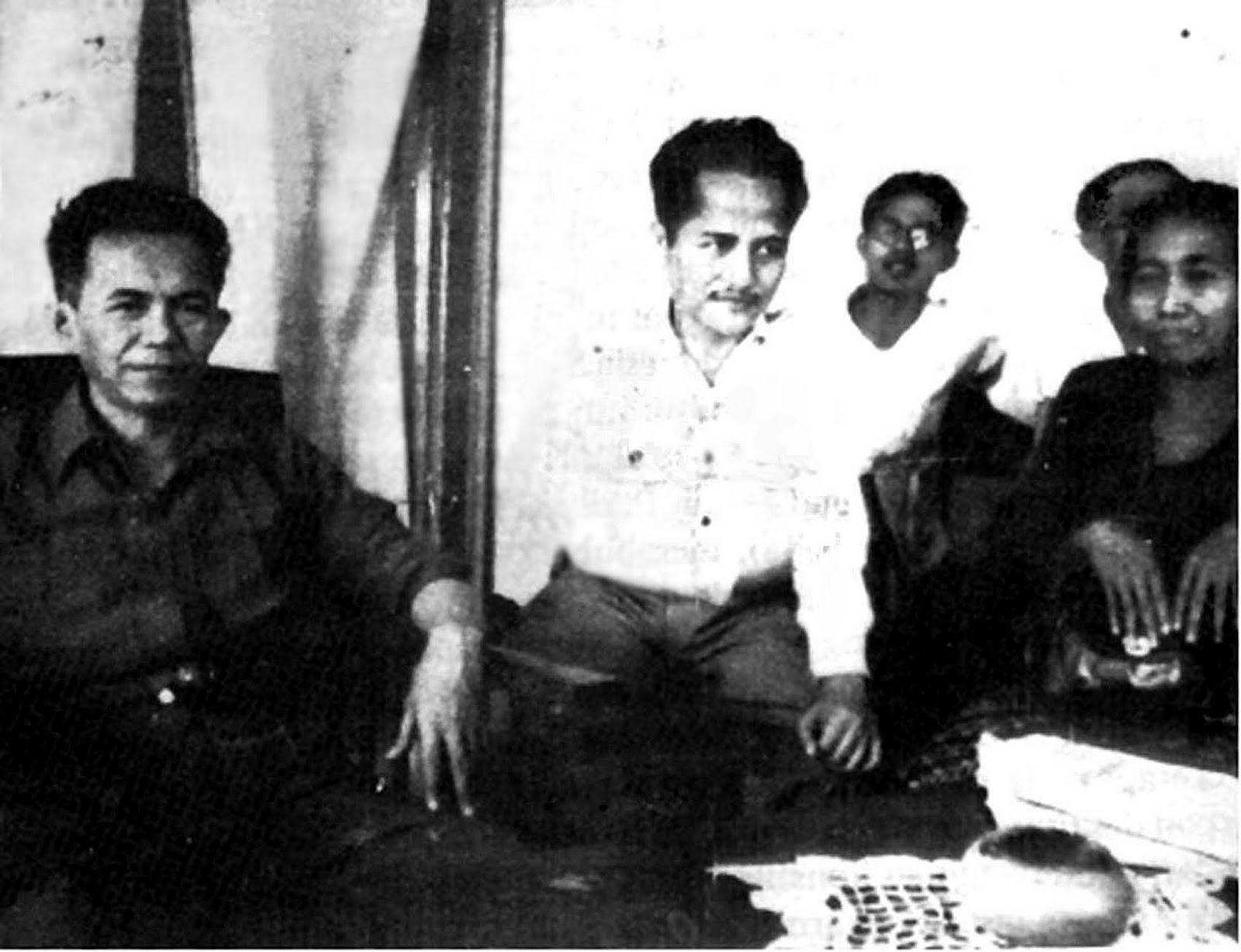
Tan Malaka, Sukarni, and Sri Mangunsarkoro.
