= Formulation of Proclamation Text Museum =

- Museum Perumusan Naskah Proklamasi
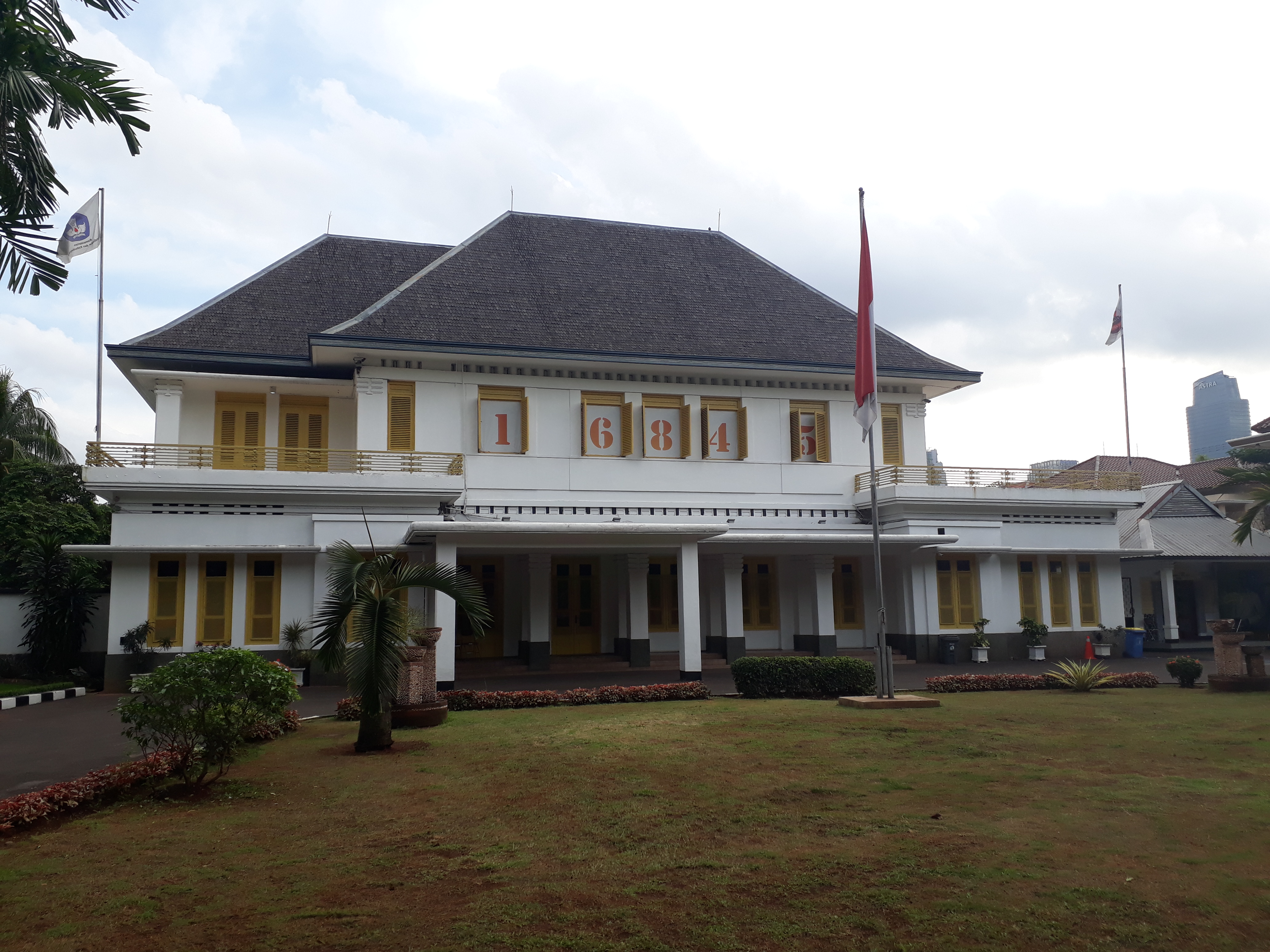
- The museum on Jl. Imam Bonjol

- Location within Jakarta
- Established: November 24, 1992
- Location: Jl. Imam Bonjol no. 1, 10310, Jakarta, Indonesia
- Coordinates: 6.2004°S 106.8311°E
- Type: History museum
- Owner: Ministry of Culture (Indonesian Heritage Agency)
- Website: munasprok.go.id

The Formulation of Proclamation Text Museum (Indonesian: Museum Perumusan Naskah Proklamasi) is a history museum in Jakarta, Indonesia. The building is where the Proclamation of Indonesian Independence was formulated.

== History ==
=== The building ===
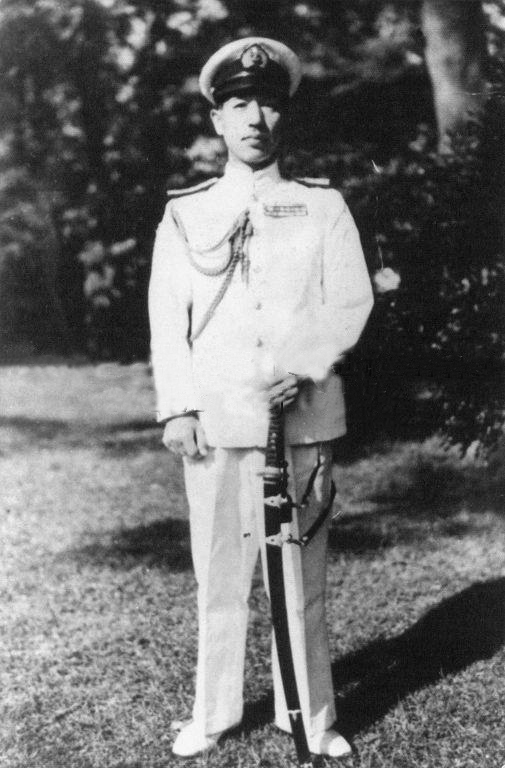
The building was converted into a residence for Rear Admiral Tadashi Maeda in 1942.

The building was built in 1920 following the design of J.F.L. Blankenberg. It is a two-floored, 1,138 m2 Art-Deco-style building over a 3,914 m2 plot of land. In 1931, the building was bought by insurance company Nillmij. At the time the Pacific War broke out, the building was being as the British General Consulate. During the Japanese occupation of the Dutch East Indies, the building became the residence of Rear Admiral Tadashi Maeda until the arrival of the Allies in Indonesia in September 1945, when the building was used by the British as the military HQ. The building was rented by the English Embassy from 1961 until 1981 when the building was given to the Indonesian Department of Education and Culture on December 28, 1981. In 1982, the building used by the National Library of Indonesia as an office building.

=== The museum ===
Because of the role of the building in the formulation of the independence proclamation text, in 1984, Minister of Education and Culture Nugroho Notosusanto directed that it be converted into a museum. The official inauguration of the Museum of the Formulation of Proclamation Text Museum was on November 24, 1992.

== Collection ==
The first room became the site of the first historical event in preparation for the formulation of the Indonesian proclamation of manuscripts. This room is used as a living room as well as an office by Maeda. In addition, this room also describes the atmosphere before the proclamation, such as the process of forming the BPUPK and the PPKI and the atomic bombings of Hiroshima and Nagasaki.

The second room became the place where Sukarno and Hatta held a meeting together at a round table with other administrators such as B.M. Diah. In this room, the original text of the proclamation was handwritten by Sukarno.

The third room has a piano, which is the place where Sukarno and Hatta signed the text of the proclamation of Indonesian independence. Another incident that also occurred in the third room was Sukarno reading the proclamation text in front of his house.

The last room is an exhibition room of objects that were worn by the individuals who were present during the formulation of the proclamation text. These objects are watches, pens and clothes. In this fourth room, Sayuti Melik and B.M. Diah typed the text of the proclamation of independence

== See also ==
- List of colonial buildings and structures in Jakarta
- List of museums and cultural institutions in Indonesia
