= Maruto Nitimihardjo =

Indonesian politician (1906–1989)

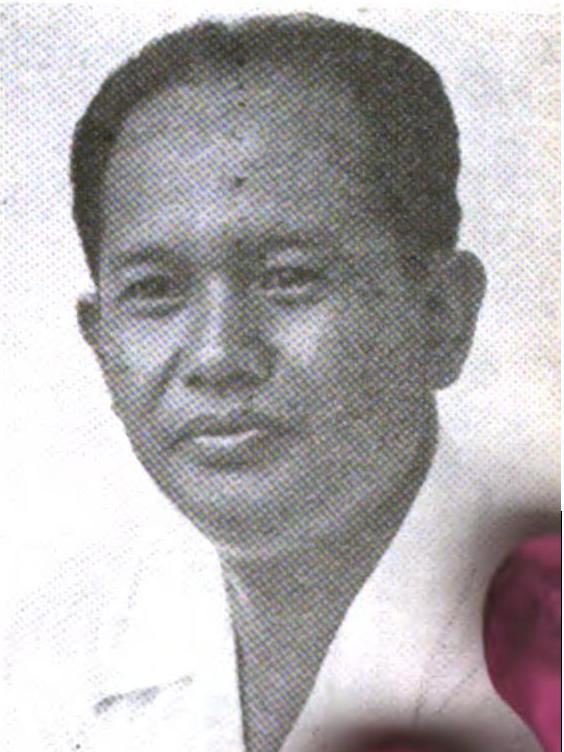
- Born: Maruto Nitimihardjo; December 26, 1906; Cirebon, Jawa Barat
- Died: January 17, 1989 (aged 82)
- Known for: Independence figure

Maruto Nitimihardjo (26 December 1906 – 17 January 1989) was an Indonesian politician born in Cirebon on 26 December 1906. Following the Proclamation of Indonesian Independence, he worked at the Antara news agency office in Yogyakarta from January 1946, and in February 1947 became a member of the agency's leadership. From April 1947 to 1950, he served as a member of the Working Committee of the KNIP, initially representing the People's Party and later the Murba Party.

== Personal life ==
Maroeto was born in Cirebon on 26 December 1906 into a pamong praja (native civil service) family. His father, Sukirman, was a Mantri Pengairan, an official responsible for managing irrigation for rice fields at the subdistrict level, while his grandfather, Nitisastro, had served as an assistant wedana. Maroeto attended the HIS (equivalent to primary school) in Kebonbaru, before continuing his studies at a MULO school in Purwokerto, as there was no institution equivalent to a junior high school in Cirebon. He then pursued an education equivalent to senior high school at the AMS-A in Yogyakarta. After graduating from the AMS, Maroeto continued his education at the law college, the RHS, in Jakarta.

== Bibliography ==
- Hadidjojo (2009). Ayahku Maroeto Nitimihardjo: mengungkap rahasia gerakan kemerdekaan. Kata Hasta Pustaka. ISBN 978-9-7910-5628-1. LCCN 2009330492. OCLC 436387333. OL 24045639M.
