= Wikana =

Indonesian independence leader (1914–1966)

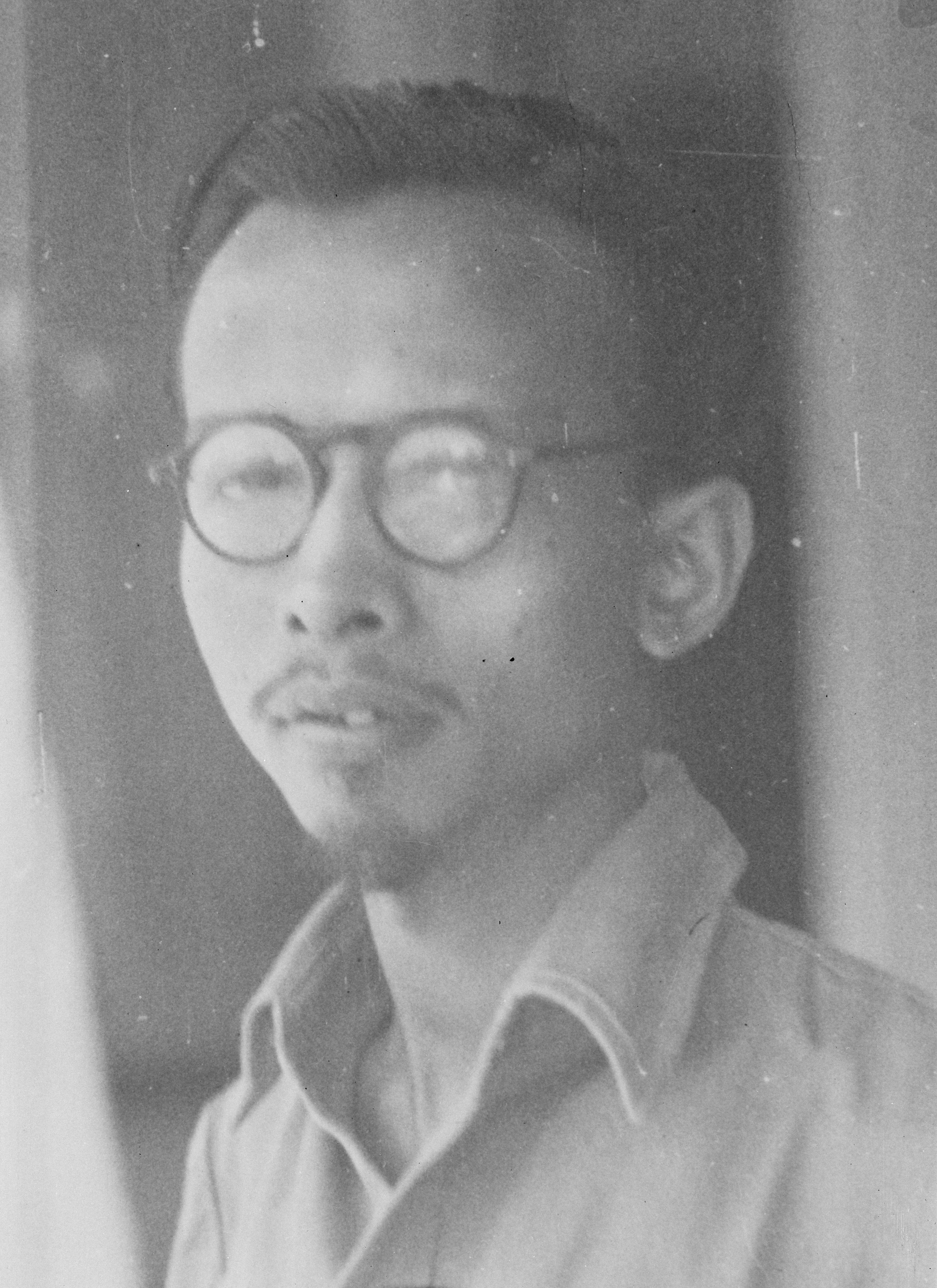
- Wikana in 1947

1st State Minister of Youth Affairs
- In office 29 June 1946 – 29 January 1948
- President: Sukarno
- Prime Minister: Sutan Sjahrir; Amir Sjarifuddin
- Preceded by: Office established
- Succeeded by: Supeno

Member of the Constitutional Assembly
- In office 9 November 1956 – 5 July 1959
- Preceded by: Assembly established
- Succeeded by: Assembly abolished

Personal details
- Born: 16 October 1914 Sumedang, Dutch East Indies
- Died: 9 June 1966 (age 51) (disappeared) Jakarta, Indonesia
- Party: Communist Party of Indonesia
- Spouse: Asminah binti Oesman (m. 1940)
- Children: 6
- Parent(s): Raden Haji Soelaiman; Nonoh
- Education: Meer Uitgebreid Lager Onderwijs (MULO)

Wikana (16 October 1914 – 1966) was an Indonesian minister and independence leader. He was one of the youths who forced Sukarno and Hatta to declare independence immediately after the surrender of the Japanese. He was the first Indonesian Minister of Youth and Sport (although in his era the office was called Minister of State for Youth Affairs). He was a member of the Indonesian Communist Party. Sometime after the 1965 coup d'état attempt, he was arrested and went missing. It is supposed that he was one of the assassinated in the Indonesian mass killings of 1965–66.

== Biography ==
=== Early life ===
Wikana was born on 16 October 1914 in Sumedang. He was the fourteenth child of sixteen. His father was Raden Haji Soelaiman, from Demak, and his mother was Nonoh. His brother was Winanta, an exile to Boven Digul, according to Soemarsono, one of youth leaders generation '45. Wikana attended a Dutch-speaking Europeesch Lagere School (ELS) and continued his study to a Meer Uitgebreid Lager Onderwijs school (MULO). After graduating from MULO, Wikana became a contributor to theBandung weekly Fikiran Rakjat

According to Communist Party of Indonesia (PKI) member Trikoyo Ramidjo, Wikana was a member of the party since the 1930s. He also was a member of the Bandung branch of Partai Indonesia (Partindo). In 1935, Wikana went to Surabaya to head the Masjarakat Baroe weekly. In 1938 he went to Jakarta to take charge of the Kebangoenan daily. In the same year, he was elected second secretary of Gerindo (Indonesian People's Movement) and chairman of its youth section, Barisan Pemuda Gerindo (Gerindo Youth Wing). In October 1938, Wikana, Amir Sjarifuddin, Asmara Hadi, dan A.M. Sipahutar became the editorial board of political monthly magazine Toedjoean Rakjat. Wikana also contributed to Menara Merah (Red Tower), an illegal PKI newssheet, and was responsible for the paper's circulation in West Java. In June 1940, he together with Adam Malik and Amir Sjarifuddin was suspected by colonial government after a copy of Menara Merah was discovered. Along with Adam Malik and Pandu Kartawiguna, he was charged with distributing the newspaper and arrested. After the Dutch colonial government surrendered to the Japanese imperial army, Wikana was released from Cilacap prison.

Around September or October 1944, Wikana offered Sjahrir a job as a lecturer at the Asrama Indonesia Merdeka, a school for Indonesian youths who had not graduated from high school. The school was supported and supervised by two Japanese, Yoshizumi Tomegoro and Nishijima Shigetada, and opened in December 1944 in Jakarta. Besides Wikana and Sjahrir, the teachers were Sukarno, Hatta, Subardjo, Iwa Kusumantri, Soediro and Sjahrir.

=== Proclamation of independence ===
On 14 August 1945, a group of youths held a meeting in the Bacteriological Laboratory in Pegangsaan after the news of the Japanese surrender spread. The result was Wikana with some other youths being sent to convince Sukarno to proclaim Indonesian independence. They left the lab and were on their way to the office of the Japanese Navy when they met Achmad Soebardjo, Iwa Kusumantri, Buntaran, and Samsi. After some talks, the youths proceeded to Sukarno's house at Jalan Pegangsaan Timur 56. After an argument with Sukarno, Wikana said to him, "If Bung Karno will not declare this proclamation, tomorrow there will be murder and bloodshed." Sukarno answered, "Here is my throat! Drag me into a corner, finish me off tonight! Don't wait till tomorrow." According to Sukarno in his autobiography Bung Karno Penyambung Lidah Rakyat, he refused to comply with Wikana's demand because he felt that they were not ready if they had to fight against the Japanese army physically. However, according to Poeze, Sukarno refused because he did not want to leave the members of the Preparatory Committee for Indonesian Independence who were in Jakarta for a meeting.

The debate became heated after Mohammad Hatta joined, invited by Soebardjo. Hatta said that the surrender news was not official yet and that he did not want the declaration to lead to chaos. Wikana then said that the youths had enough power to fight back Japanese physically. Hatta answered if the young men wanted to declare independence immediately they should declare it themselves. Wikana replied that he and the youths did not want to be responsible for any consequences if the declaration were not made immediately. In the early hours of the morning, Wikana and other youths, including Chaerul Salh, kidnapped Sukarno and Hatta and took them to Rengasdengklok to try to force them to declare independence. After pressure from the Japanese authorities, Wikana made arrangements for the men to be returned to Jakarta in exchange for a guarantee that the Japanese would not interfere in a proclamation. The following day, Sukarno proclaimed independence in Jakarta

=== Post-independence career ===
On 18 August, Wikana, Chairul Saleh, and Sukarni attended a PPKI meeting. On 27 August, Wikana was elected one of the leaders of the Indonesian National Party (PNI). He subsequently joined the Angkatan Pemuda Indonesia (API; Indonesian Youth Force), later becoming the chairman. He went with Soemarsono to Yogyakarta to attend the First Youth Congress on 10 November 1945. The result was seven of twenty nine organizations merging into one, Pemuda Sosialis Indonesia (Pesindo; Socialist Youth of Indonesia). On 11 November, Wikana was elected vice chairman of the organization.

Wikana was the State Minister of Youth Affairs during two cabinets led by Sjahrir cabinet and two cabinets led by Amir Sjarifuddin . One week before the first appointment, though, on behalf of the Persatuan Perjuangan, Wikana stated that he did not want to be in the cabinet. Under Amir Sjarifuddin, Wikana served from July 1947 to January 1948. He lived in Yogyakarta during the revolution Indonesia's capital moved to the city.

In early 1948, Hatta replaced Amir Sjarifuddin as prime minister. Wikana was appointed by Hatta as military governor of Surakarta. After the 1948 Madiun rebellion, Hatta replaced Wikana with Colonel Gatot Subroto. On 1 September 1948, Wikana was elected secretary of the youth section of the PKI politbureau. At the Pesindo conference on 4–12 November 1950, he failed to be reelected to the executive committee. Later, on 29 December, he was forced to resign from a study group run by the Murba Party as it was seen as harmful to the interests of the PKI. Wikana remained a member of the Central Committee of the PKI until 7 January 1951 when the new leaders of the party were announced. In the 1955 Indonesian Constituent Assembly election 1955 general election, Wikana and Alimin represented the PKI for Constituent Assembly. Later, in December 1956, Wikana was appointed as secretary of the party fraction in the assembly. After the sixth congress of the party in September 1959, Wikana was reelected as full member of central committee.

In 1963 he was a member of the Supreme Advisory Council (DPA). In 1965, he was invited by Chairul Saleh to be a member of the People's Consultative Assembly (MPRS). However, none of these positions gave him any real power, either in the party or in government.

=== 30 September Movement and disappearance ===
Sometime before the 1965 30th September Movement coup attempt, Wikana and other PKI delegates went to Beijing, China, to celebrate the national day of China. After the news of the coup attempt spread, Wikana ordered other delegates to stay in Beijing. Despite rumours that the PKI was behind the coup attempt, Wikana returned to Indonesia, possibly feeling that he would be safe as he was not a key PKI figure. He arrived in Jakarta on 10 October 1965. According to Chairul Saleh in AM Hanafi Menggugat, when Wikana arrived at Kemayoran Airport, he was immediately arrested by the military. According to Wikana's third child, he was detained in Kramat. After being questioned for two nights, Wikana was released. On 9 June 1966, he was arrested by around ten unidentified armed men in his house. His family made enquiries with military units, but Wikana was never seen again. It is presumed that Wikana died in 1966.

== Legacy ==
Wikana's works are about movements and communism. He wrote Organisatie, Pengoempoelan Boeah Pena (Oesaha Penerbitan Tengara, 1947), Dokumentasi Pemuda Sekitar Proklamasi Indonesia Merdeka (co-written with D. N. Aidit and Legiono, published by Badan Penerangan Pusat SBPI, 1948), and Satu Dua Pandangan Marxisme (Revolusioner, 194x).

== Personal life ==
Wikana married Asminah binti Oesman in Kemayoran, 1940. They had six children: Lenina Soewarti Wiasti Wikana Putri, Temo Zein Karmawan Soekana Pria, Tati Sawitri Apramata, Kania Kingkin Pratapa, Rani Sadakarana, and Remondi Sitakodana. According to his third child, Wikana was able to speak English, German, French and Russian.

== See also ==
- List of people who disappeared
