= Tadashi Maeda (admiral) =

Japanese admiral

- 前田 精
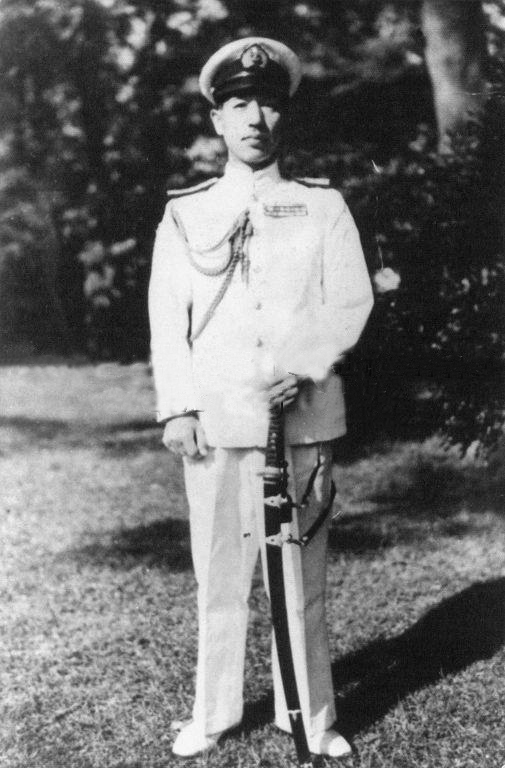
- Born: 3 March 1898; Kajiki, Kagoshima, Japan
- Died: 13 December 1977 (aged 79); Japan
- Military career
- Allegiance: Empire of Japan
- Branch: Imperial Japanese Navy
- Rank: Rear Admiral

Rear Admiral Tadashi Maeda (前田 精, Maeda Tadashi; 3 March 1898 – 13 December 1977) was a high-ranking Imperial Japanese Navy officer during the Pacific War. He was a key supporter of the Indonesian independence movement, especially in the last months of the Japanese occupation of Indonesia between late 1944 and August 1945.

Prior to the war, Maeda was assigned to adjutant, liaison, and intelligence roles in the navy, with his task including establishing a Japanese network in the Dutch East Indies. Stationed in Batavia after the invasion, he sponsored an Indonesian nationalist school and built up relations with Indonesian nationalists. Maeda played a key role in the proclamation of Indonesian independence, with many key events in its leadup taking place in his house and with his involvement. He left the navy after the war, and engaged in Japanese oil ventures in Indonesia. The Government of Indonesia has publicly acknowledged his role in securing the country's independence.

== Early life and career ==
Maeda was born in the town of Kajiki, Kagoshima on 3 March 1898. His father was a school principal there, and he was part of a former samurai family. He joined a Marine College at the age of 18, specializing in navigation, and he was a first lieutenant by 1930 when he joined the Naval Staff.

== Military career ==
=== Pre-World War II ===
After joining the Naval Staff, he worked at the European Affairs section for one and a half years before moving to the Naval Station at Ōminato, where he was stationed between 1932 and 1934. During this time period, his wife died, and Maeda did not remarry. In early 1937, Maeda became the adjutant to Rear Admiral Sonosuke Kobayashi during his visit to England to represent Japan in the Coronation of King George VI and Queen Elizabeth. They traveled aboard the cruiser Ashigara. Afterwards, he served as aide-de-camp to admirals Zengo Yoshida and Kiyoshi Hasegawa.

Maeda became the Japanese naval attaché to the Netherlands in 1940. Following the German invasion of Denmark and Norway, he warned the Dutch that an invasion of their country was certain and they began to prepare accordingly. In October that year, he went to Batavia in a diplomatic mission attempting to secure trade between the Dutch East Indies and Japan – particularly in oil. In addition to trade negotiations, he was also tasked with espionage and establishing a fifth column, supported by civilians such as Shigetada Nishijima. Maeda returned to Japan in mid-1941, when he was made deputy of the European Affairs section under his elder brother Minoru Maeda.

=== Occupation and revolution ===
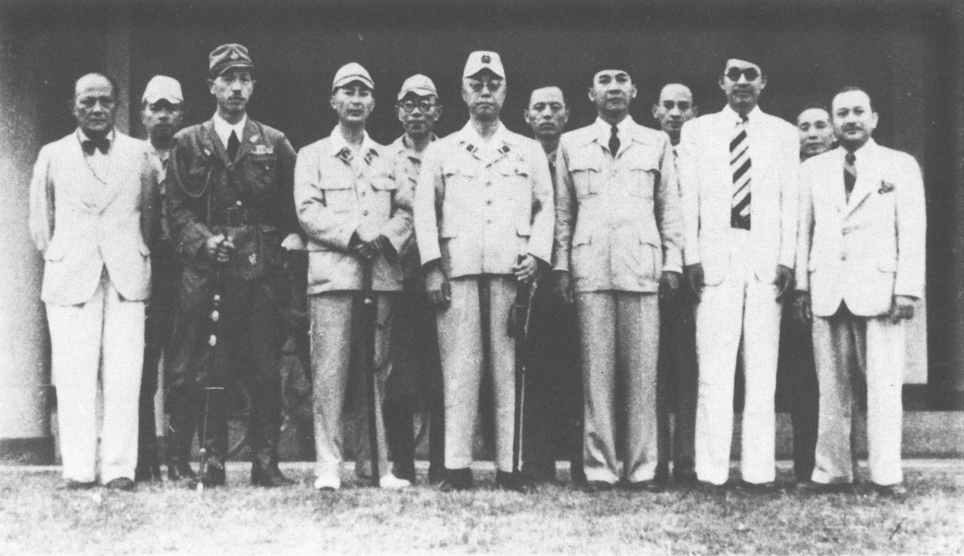
Maeda (front row, second from left) during Sukarno's visit to Makassar in 1945

Maeda was placed in charge of the Western New Guinea area during the Japanese invasion of the Dutch East Indies. After the invasion, Maeda was dispatched again to Batavia/Jakarta in August 1942 as a liaison between the Japanese Sixteenth Army and the naval forces. In October 1944, following a declaration by Japanese Prime Minister Kuniaki Koiso promising Indonesian independence, Maeda sponsored a school known as Asrama Indonesia Merdeka. Maeda stated that the intent of the Asrama was to prepare a younger generation of Indonesian leaders.

Following the 1945 surrender of Japan, nationalist leaders Sukarno, Mohammad Hatta, and Achmad Soebardjo went to Maeda's house on 15 August to confirm the surrender, which Maeda unofficially confirmed. Early the following morning, Sukarno and Hatta were kidnapped by nationalist youths (pemuda) and taken to Rengasdengklok, Karawang. Maeda and Soebardjo found out several hours later, and after guaranteeing the pemuda safety from the Kempeitai Maeda offered his house to be used as the site for negotiations. Fearing intervention from the still-present Japanese Army, Maeda pushed for a declaration of independence, wanting an orderly sovereignty transfer. Negotiations followed between Maeda, Sukarno and Hatta with army authorities – who by the terms of surrender were required to maintain the status quo – and the authorities agreed to allow a declaration of independence provided order was maintained and the Japanese were not involved.

On 17 August before dawn, a group – Maeda, Sukarno, Hatta, Soebardjo, Nishijima, Tomegorō Yoshizumi and Shunkichiro Miyoshi (an army representative) gathered in Maeda's house to compose the text of the declaration. After an agreement was reached on the text, the proclamation was read to the public later that day. Maeda also assisted with allowing the Naval Office press to be used to print copies of the proclamation text, which was distributed across Jakarta. Maeda was later arrested by Allied authorities along with his staff and imprisoned for failing to maintain the status quo. He was later tried by a Japanese military court, found not guilty, and was released in 1947. He left military life.

== Later career ==
In the 1950s, Maeda, Nishijima and Miyoshi published their memoirs which included their part in the declaration of independence – though some of their contributions were denounced by Sukarno in a 17 August 1959 speech (specifically, Sukarno attacked accusations that the Indonesian National Revolution was Japanese-made). Just the previous year, Maeda had had a reunion with Sukarno during the latter's 1958 visit to Japan.

Regardless, according to Maeda's son, both of them remained in close contact and Sukarno visited Maeda when the latter fell ill. Furthermore, in 1962, following the West New Guinea dispute, Sukarno accepted Maeda's offer to resume oil exploration by Japanese companies in the Vogelkop Peninsula area. During Maeda's military time, he had been aware of the potential for oil production there. Prior to this, Maeda (and Nishijima) had also been involved with Indonesian crude oil exports through Permina (later merged to form Pertamina), and participated in a joint venture with a PKI-controlled company.

== Legacy ==
Following the Indonesian independence, some political groups in Indonesia – particularly those associated with Sutan Sjahrir – attempted to discredit Maeda's contribution to Indonesia's independence, accusing the Asrama of being training centers for anti-communist infiltrators. On the other hand, Wikana's writings explicitly stated that Maeda was sincere in his support, and others noted that Maeda often intervened to save Indonesians who were being suspected by the Kempeitai. British historian Benedict Anderson proposed that Maeda and other Japanese collaborators had viewed the cooperation as beneficial to long-term relations between Indonesia and Japan. His former subordinate Nishijima regarded Maeda as "politically, a naive person" regarding his public involvement in the joint venture with the PKI.

In 1973, Maeda was invited to Indonesia to receive the Bintang Jasa Nararya. After Maeda's death on 13 December 1977, Indonesian Foreign Minister Adam Malik sent a telegram to Japan, acknowledging Maeda's aid in the declaration of independence and wrote that his name "will be written in the annals of Indonesia with golden letters". Maeda's former house is today the Formulation of Proclamation Text Museum. His eldest son, Toaji Nishimura, was invited to Jakarta to commemorate Indonesia's 70th independence day in 2015, re-enacting the proclamation text's formulation with Sukarno's grandson Romy Soekarno and Hatta's daughter Halida Hatta.

== Bibliography ==
Anderson, Benedict (2006). Java in a Time of Revolution: Occupation and Resistance, 1944-1946. Equinox Publishing. ISBN 9789793780146.
Poulgrain, Greg (1999). "Delaying the 'Discovery' of Oil in West New Guinea". The Journal of Pacific History. 34 (2): 205–218. doi:10.1080/00223349908572903. ISSN 0022-3344. JSTOR 25161079.
