= Pandu Kartawiguna =

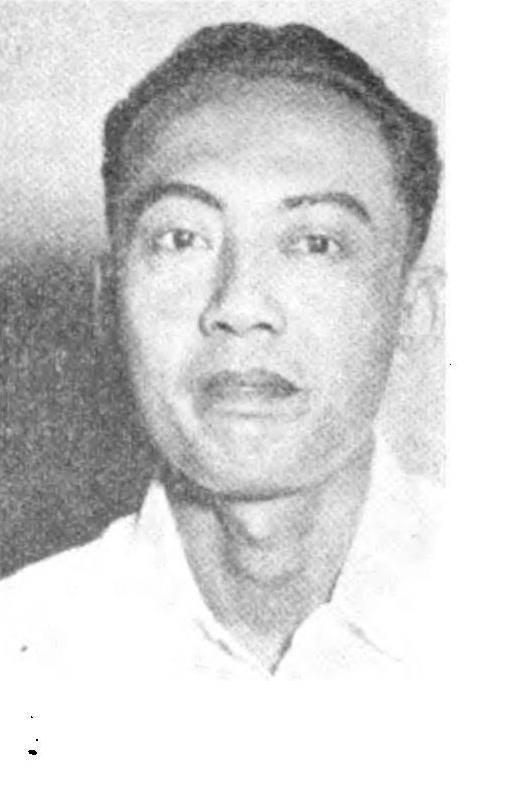
- Pandu Kertawiguna, 1954

Member of People's Representative Council
- In office 16 August 1950 – 1961
- Constituency: West Java (1956-1959)

Personal details
- Born: 13 February 1913
- Died: 4 September
- Party: Murba
- Occupation: Politician

Pandu Kartawiguna (born in Cirebon, 13 February 1913 – died 4 September) was an activist of the 1945 Generation and a figure in the Indonesian press. He was among the pioneers who founded the Antara National News Agency in 1937, headquartered at Jl. Pinangsia 38, Jakarta Kota. With only an old writing desk, an old typewriter, and an old mimeograph machine, they supplied news to various national newspapers.

At the critical juncture preceding the Indonesian National Revolution, Pandu reportedly pounded the table and became angry upon hearing Sutan Sjahrir express hesitation after being urged to become the proclaimer of Indonesian independence. The underground youth activists had previously prepared a proclamation in an effort to prevent what they feared would be seen as a ''Japanese-made proclamation'', and had agreed that Sjahrir should lead the struggle because he was considered free from accusations of collaboration with Japan. Adam Malik laughed and understood Sjahrir's reasoning, while Chaerul Saleh shared Adam Malik's view.

During the war, Pandu became the Secretary-General of the Common People's Party (Indonesian: Partai Rakyat Djelata; PRD) led by St. Dawanis. The party would join Tan Malaka's Persatuan Perjuangan for the advocacy of 100% Independence. The political party would merge to form Tan Malaka's Murba Party, with Pandu Kartawiguna becoming the party's secretary. In a speech given by Tan Malaka, "Uraian Mendadak" in 1948, Tan Malaka would praise Pandu as a young leader who "talks very little, but demands many proof."

In 1955, Member of the House of Representatives (DPR) period 1956-1959. He was elected through the 1955 election to represent the Murba Party for the constituency of West Java province. Through Presidential Decree No. 490 of 1961, he was officially dismissed from membership of the Gotong Royong DPR (DPR-GR) along with D.N. Aidit of the Communist Party of Indonesia (PKI).

== Career ==
- General Manager of the Antara News Agency.

== Bibliography ==
- Shahab, Alwi. (2006). Cerita-cerita Betawi: Maria van Engels menantu Habib Kwitang. Penerbit Republika. ISBN 978-979-3210-72-8.
