= Achmad Soebardjo =

Indonesian politician and diplomat (1896–1978)

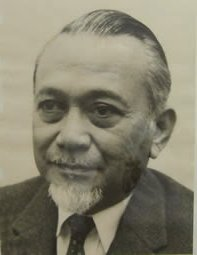
- Soebardjo, 1950

1st Minister of Foreign Affairs
- In office 2 September 1945 – 14 November 1945
- President: Sukarno
- Preceded by: Position established
- Succeeded by: Sutan Sjahrir
- In office 26 April 1951 – 21 February 1952
- Prime Minister: Soekiman Wirjosandjojo
- Preceded by: Mohammad Roem
- Succeeded by: Wilopo

Ambassador of Indonesia to Switzerland
- In office 12 September 1957 – 8 May 1961
- Preceded by: R. P. Subechi (CDA)
- Succeeded by: Mohammad Nazir Isa

Personal details
- Born: Abdul Manaf; 23 March 1896 Karawang, Dutch East Indies
- Died: 15 December 1978 (aged 82) Jakarta, Indonesia
- Education: Leiden University

Achmad Soebardjo Djojoadisoerjo (EYD: Ahmad Subarjo Joyoadisuryo; 23 March 1896 – 15 December 1978) was an Indonesian diplomat, lawyer, and statesman. He served as the first foreign minister of Indonesia in 1945 shortly after the proclamation of Indonesian independence, and again in 1951–1952 within the Soekiman Cabinet.

Born in Karawang into an aristocratic family, Soebardjo began studying at Leiden University in the Netherlands in 1919. He spent over ten years in the Netherlands and in Europe, being active in Indonesian nationalist activism there. He returned to Indonesia in 1934, working as a lawyer and building connections to the Japanese military following a one-year stay in Japan. He would join the military occupation government of Japan in Indonesia after its invasion in 1942. In 1945, he was part of the Investigating Committee for Preparatory Work for Independence, and took part in the drafting of the Constitution of Indonesia. Following Japan's surrender, Soebardjo played a key role in the leadup to the proclamation of Indonesian independence.

Due to his leadership over Japanese-appointed officials, Soebardjo held significant influence in the newly formed government of Indonesia and was added to the Preparatory Committee for Indonesian Independence. He was appointed foreign minister in its first cabinet formed in September 1945. Soebardjo's two-month tenure was focused on the actual establishment of the foreign ministry and the recruitment of its first staff. His influence waned due to the increasing prominence of Sutan Sjahrir, who became prime minister and foreign minister in November 1945. Soebardjo would join an opposition movement against Sjahrir, culminating in a failed coup attempt in 1946 which caused his imprisonment for much of the rest of the revolutionary period.

Soebardjo was reappointed as foreign minister in the Soekiman Cabinet in 1951, and during this period he signed the Treaty of San Francisco and negotiated aid with the United States. After approving the terms of aid under the Mutual Security Act without prior cabinet knowledge, Soebardjo came under heavy political pressure and resigned in February 1952, the cabinet collapsing shortly after. He continued to work as an advisor to the foreign ministry, and between 1957 and 1961 he was Indonesia's Ambassador to Switzerland and its chief delegate to the United Nations Convention on the Law of the Sea. Continuing to work for the foreign ministry until 1968, he also joined the Supreme Advisory Council and lectured history at the University of Indonesia for a time. He died in 1978 and was made a National Hero of Indonesia in 2009.

== Early life ==
Achmad Soebardjo was born Abdul Manaf in Teluk Jambe, Karawang Regency, West Java, on 23 March 1896. He was the youngest of four children. His father, Teuku Muhammad Yusuf, descended from Acehnese aristocracy in Pidie and worked as a police officer in Teluk Jambe. His mother Wardinah was of Javanese–Bugis descent, with Wardinah's father being a camat (district head) in Cirebon. Manaf's name was changed to Achmad Soebardjo during his childhood – Soebardjo (Note: Also spelled Subardjo or Subarjo) originating from a suggestion by his father's friend while Achmad was added by his grandfather. Soebardjo later added "Djojoadisoerjo" as a surname, in a 1977 interview claiming that he heard a voice telling him to do so while urinating during his imprisonment after the 3 July affair in 1946.

He began his studies at the Europeesche Lagere School (ELS) of Batavia, a mixed school attended by Dutch, Chinese, Arab, and Native Indonesians. According to Soebardjo, his Dutch principal at ELS considered Native Indonesians to be mentally inferior and "only fit for unskilled labor", which motivated Soebardjo to pursue higher education and pushed him towards nationalism. After ELS, he went to a Hogere Burgerschool (middle school) from which he graduated in 1917. He began to participate in the burgeoning Indonesian nationalist movement after 1917, joining the youth organization Jong Java (then named Tri Koro Dharmo) before departing for the Netherlands to study law at Leiden University in 1919.

== Student activism ==
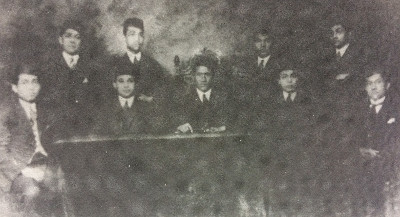
Soebardjo (second from left) with other Perhimpunan Indonesia leaders, 1925.

Soebardjo completed his studies at Leiden in 1922 and received a bachelor's degree, and during this time he had chaired the Indische Vereeniging (Indies' Association, later Perhimpunan Indonesia) student association between 1919 and 1921. He pushed for the association to adopt the red and white flag as a symbol. He briefly returned to Indonesia in 1922, but returned to Leiden that same year to pursue a master's degree, later commenting that "his grandfather was embarrassed to have [Soebardjo] without a title". He was more politically active in his second period in the Netherlands, and frequently travelled across Europe including to Germany, Austria, the United Kingdom, and France.

In February 1927, Soebardjo took part in the League Against Imperialism and Colonial Oppression's founding congress in Brussels. Aside from Perhimpunan Indonesia, he also represented the Cairo branch of the Jamiat Kheir. While other Indonesian delegates returned to the Netherlands after the congress, Soebardjo moved to Berlin for a time and befriended the Indian revolutionary Virendranath Chattopadhyaya. While Soebardjo was in Berlin, Indonesian student leaders in the Netherlands such as Mohammad Hatta and Ali Sastroamidjojo faced widespread arrests. Soebardjo, who often used his birth name Abdul Manaf in registrations, evaded capture. He would briefly take over leadership of Perhimpunan Indonesia during this time, and attended another congress of the League in mid-1927. In November 1927, Soebardjo also travelled to Moscow to attend the tenth anniversary of the Soviet Union, which he received an invitation to attend. During his visit in Moscow, he met Shakib Arslan, Georgy Chicherin, and Alexandra Kollontai.

He had returned to Indonesia at some point after over ten years of studies in Europe as he was unable to complete his degree, being labelled as a "dangerous communist" by the Dutch judiciary. Soebardjo was eventually allowed to return to Leiden after an influential family member intervened. He graduated from Leiden with a Meester in de rechten (Mr.) title in 1933, and returned to Indonesia again in April 1934.

== Colonial period ==
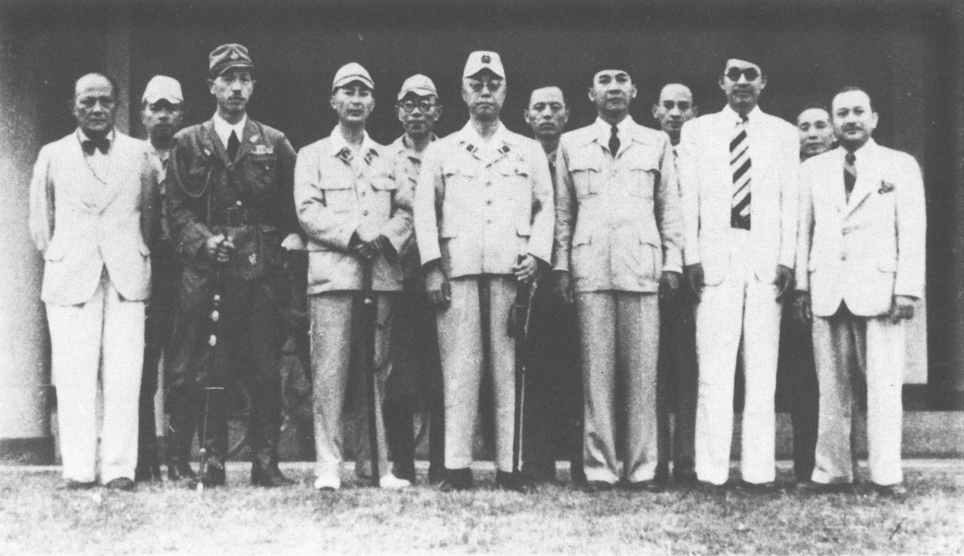
Soebardjo (rightmost) in Makassar with Japanese officers and Indonesian nationalists, April 1945.

Upon his return to Indonesia, Soebardjo was appointed as a lawyer at the colonial court in Surabaya after the Dutch East Indies government received assurances that he would not take part in politics. Initially, he worked at the law office of Sastromoeljono before joining the law office of Iskaq Tjokrohadisurjo, and by 1935 the firm had offices in Kediri and Banjarmasin. As a lawyer, one of Soebardjo's cases involved defending a newly published nationalist magazine, Soeara Madoera, which was censured in 1934 after calling for armed resistance against the colonial government. He separated from Iskaq in 1935 and founded another firm in Malang, but the firm was unsuccessful.

Throughout most of 1936, Soebardjo worked a stint as a correspondent for the Semarang-based newspaper Matahari and he stayed for twelve months in Japan. During his stay there, he was introduced to Japanese military officials especially that of the Imperial Japanese Navy by Raden Soedjono, a relative who was professor of Malay at Tokyo University and a fellow Leiden alumni. In Soebardjo's later recollections, he wrote of his awestruck reaction to the modern development of Tokyo. While there, he would also lead a delegation of Indonesian nationalists from Parindra as a guide.

Upon his return from Japan, Soebardjo continued practicing as a lawyer with his office in Bandung, and in late 1936 he was honorably discharged from the Surabaya court at his request to move to the colonial Supreme Court. Aside from his lawyer work, Soebardjo also wrote for the Dutch language Kritick en Opbouw magazine in Bandung, and worked for a time in the colonial government's economic affairs department. He continued to maintain contact with Japan as the Pacific War approached, and by September 1941 he was working with Japanese spy Shigetada Nishijima to form a clandestine group intended to sabotage Dutch defence efforts against a Japanese invasion.

Following the Japanese invasion in 1942, Soebardjo joined a General Advisory Office (Kantor Penasihat Oemoem) of the Japanese military occupation government which had been founded by Mohammad Hatta. Within the office, Soebardjo had the position of chief of the research section. He also lectured at the Japan-founded Asrama Angkatan Baroe, a training center for nationalist youths. In late 1942, however, his pre-war communist sympathies resulted in his imprisonment by the Kempeitai military police. He would be released in mid-1943, and was hired by the Japanese Navy's liaison office led by Rear Admiral Tadashi Maeda where he worked with Nishijima.

== Revolution era ==
=== Leadup to the proclamation ===
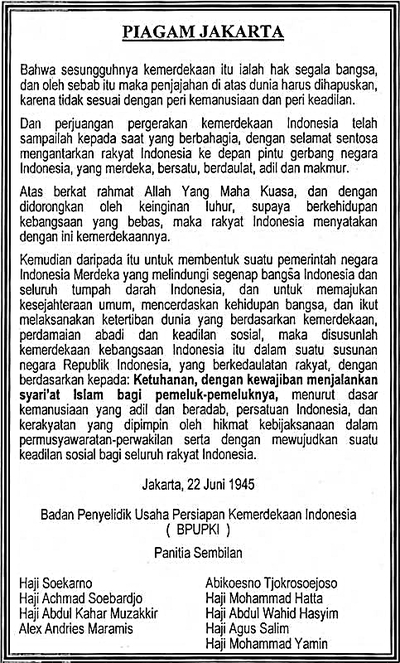
The Jakarta Charter produced by the nine-man subcommittee, including Soebardjo.

By 1945, Japanese reversals in the war had led its government to move to enlist increased Indonesian support through allowing more nationalist activities and promising independence. Soebardjo was appointed to the Investigating Committee for Preparatory Work for Independence (BPUPK), and within it he became a member of the nine-man subcommittee (Panitia Sembilan) tasked with initial drafts for the Constitution of Indonesia. In his autobiography, Soebardjo claimed that he proposed the inclusion of national self-determination and anti-colonial messaging to the preamble of the constitution, becoming the preamble's first paragraph. Soebardjo would also join a nineteen-man committee which drafted the full constitution. Prior to BPUPK's founding, Soebardjo had been part of a seven-man group led by Soepomo which drafted a provisional constitution in 1942.

On 14 August 1945, Soebardjo was appointed as a special advisor to the Preparatory Committee for Indonesian Independence (PPKI). Japan surrendered the following day, and the news reached Jakarta by noon. Soebardjo along with Sukarno and Hatta received the news from Maeda that afternoon, and Nishijima noted Soebardjo's reaction:

Whether Japan surrenders or not does not influence our possible independence. We have only one way to go–ahead!

Hatta immediately called for a meeting of PPKI, and Soebardjo organized a meeting at 10 AM on 16 August. As news of the surrender spread among Indonesian nationalists, nationalist youths led by Wikana began pressuring Sukarno to declare independence immediately. Soebardjo arrived at Sukarno's house to find a heated debate between Wikana's group and Sukarno. The group stormed off after Sukarno and Hatta (who arrived later) refused to immediately proclaim independence.

At 4 AM on 16 August, the nationalist youths organized a kidnapping of Sukarno and Hatta, bringing them to a PETA militia base in Rengasdengklok, Karawang. In the morning, Soebardjo and Maeda learned of the two's disappearance, with Nishijima eventually learning of the two's whereabouts. Soebardjo departed for Rengasdengklok and recovered Sukarno and Hatta by evening. According to Soebardjo's autobiography, he made a personal guarantee to a PETA officer that the proclamation would be done by noon on 17 August at the latest. Once in Jakarta, the three met with the summoned PPKI members and proceeded to draft a proclamation text along with Maeda, Nishijima, and two other Japanese military staff throughout midnight. It was read by Sukarno at 10 AM that day in a simple ceremony. Soebardjo did not attend the ceremony, choosing instead to sleep and telling envoys sent to pick him up to proceed without him.

=== PPKI and ministership ===
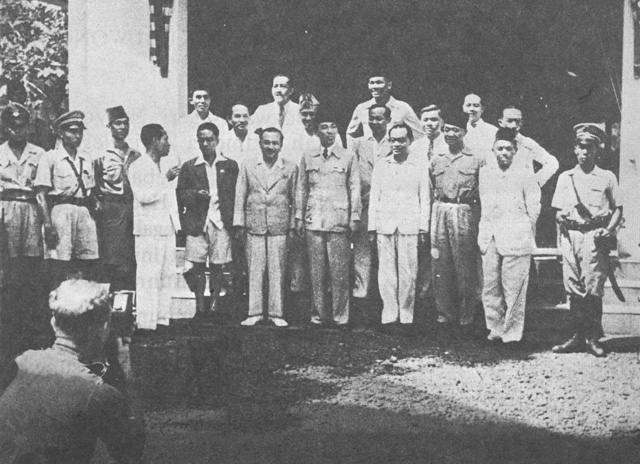
The September 1945 cabinet. Soebardjo is in the back row, wearing a tie.

On 18 August, Soebardjo joined the PPKI as a full member, with the group's members increasing from 21 to 27. During the PPKI meeting that day, Soebardjo proposed that a constitutional amendment could be done with a simple majority vote, but his proposal was defeated in a 16–11 vote and instead a two-thirds vote requirement was adopted. In the following meeting on 19 August, Soebardjo along with Kasman Singodimedjo and Soetardjo Kartohadikusumo formed a subcommittee to draft the cabinet structure of the government, eventually settling at twelve departments. On 22 August, the PPKI voted to set up a Central Indonesian National Committee (KNIP) with 137 members, and PPKI was dissolved on 27 August.

Politically, KNIP members initially joined the Indonesian National Party (PNI), with Soebardjo being absent from its leadership. Due to criticism from other nationalists such as Sutan Sjahrir, PNI would be suspended by 31 August. In its absence, a Soebardjo-led informal grouping of various nationalist leaders who had held positions in the Japanese occupation government became a major political force. In late August, Soebardjo was visited by communist leader Tan Malaka (previously thought dead) and he arranged a meeting between Tan Malaka with Sukarno and other leaders. In the meeting, Sukarno and Hatta noted that should they be incapacitated or killed, leadership would be handed to Tan Malaka, Sjahrir, Iwa Kusumasumantri (added at Soebardjo's suggestion, to represent the Sundanese people), and Wongsonegoro. Sjahrir later alleged that Soebardjo did not inform him of this decision.

On 4 September 1945, Sukarno formed Indonesia's first cabinet, with Soebardjo as foreign minister. His appointment as minister did not contain any specifications about his duties as minister, and there was no defined organizational structure for the ministry. After his appointment, Soebardjo faced a staff shortage – while other government departments could draw from a pool of ex-colonial employees, the Dutch East Indies had no foreign affairs department with diplomacy being conducted from the Netherlands. To find recruits, Soebardjo advertised a call for applications in newspapers and interviewed candidates on their general knowledge and English proficiency. One newspaper ad in Asia Raya simply asked "Who Wants to be a Foreign Department Employee?", and it resulted in ten recruited staffers.

He initially conducted his duties as foreign minister from his house in Cikini (in today's Central Jakarta), with his ten staff members. His immediate foreign policy objective was to secure international recognition of the newly declared state. On 8 October, Soebardjo appointed Soedjono as secretary of the ministry, and by late October the department acquired its own building.

By October, Allied forces (mainly British) began arriving in Indonesia, and Soebardjo met with British commander Philip Christison, who asked him to provide the newly formed Indonesian Army with uniforms to distinguish them from violent mobs. Soebardjo advised the rest of the cabinet not to take action on behalf of the British military administration. The department under Soebardjo also collected negative reports of Dutch military actions and translated them into English for Allied military headquarters. It also translated the United Nations Charter into Indonesian.

When nationalist youths organized a rally at Jakarta's Ikada Square during mid-September, Soebardjo strongly pushed the cabinet to support it. Later in 1945, increased influence of the militant youths had overtaken the older political leaders in Jakarta who held little effective power outside the city, and Sutan Sjahrir convinced Sukarno to appoint him as cabinet formateur. On 14 November, Sjahrir's cabinet was announced, with Sjahrir being prime minister, interior minister, and foreign affairs minister replacing Soebardjo. Political parties also began forming in November and December, with many members of Soebardjo's group opting to join a formal party.

=== Coup attempt and prison ===
By mid-1946, Sjahrir's policy of negotiations with the Dutch had led to a developing opposition of which Soebardjo was a member. The group organized a kidnapping of Sjahrir, which was conducted at night on 27 June. Soebardjo, together with Mohammad Yamin and Chaerul Saleh, drafted a four-point demand to Sukarno, which included the dismissal of Sjahrir and appointment of a new cabinet largely resembling the September 1945 cabinet. Sukarno met with the coup leaders on 3 July, immediately rejecting their demands, with the group's military leader Sudarsono being dismissed from the military.

Soebardjo was arrested for his role in the affair, and was imprisoned pending his trial. He was found guilty at the trial in May 1948 and was sentenced to three years in prison, although he received an amnesty from Sukarno on 17 August 1948. During his imprisonment, Dutch military movements resulted in him being relocated across several prisons. He would be captured just months after his amnesty by the Dutch in Yogyakarta following Operation Kraai, again being imprisoned until 1949.

After his release and the handover of sovereignty in the Dutch–Indonesian Round Table Conference, Soebardjo continued to work at the foreign ministry as an advisor. Also in 1949, he founded the foreign affairs department academy (Akademi Departemen Luar Negeri/ADLN) to train future diplomats.

== Independent Indonesia ==
=== Second ministership ===
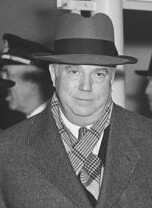
U.S. Ambassador to Indonesia in 1952, H. Merle Cochran.

On 26 April 1951, Soekiman Wirjosandjojo appointed Soebardjo as foreign minister in his cabinet. During this time, Soebardjo was politically a member of the Masyumi Party. Shortly after he was sworn in, Soebardjo stated that Indonesian foreign policy under his ministry "would not fundamentally change". As foreign minister, Soebardjo declared Indonesia's opposition to the United Nations embargo against China, stating that Indonesia would "sell to the Devil if this would serve the people's interest" on 7 May 1951. While this position was popular domestically, the cabinet would reverse this position by 16 May due to strong international pressure.

Soebardjo also represented Indonesia at the signing of the 1951 Treaty of San Francisco. Many in the cabinet considered the treaty unnecessary and that Indonesia should reach a reparations agreement with Japan bilaterally, but Soebardjo ultimately signed the treaty after he and his Philippine counterparts succeeded in convincing the American delegation to include a clause for bilateral reparations. Prior to departing for San Francisco, Soebardjo had made a visit to Rangoon to coordinate the Indonesian position with that of the Burmese government on Japanese reparations. Soebardjo also reached an informal agreement with Japanese prime minister Shigeru Yoshida regarding reparations.

On his return from San Francisco, he visited Australia to promote the Indonesian cause in the Western New Guinea dispute. Soebardjo also attended the United Nations General Assembly in Paris in November 1951, during which he engaged in trade negotiations with Arab countries. He returned to Indonesia through the Netherlands, and there he conducted some talks with the Dutch government on the New Guinea question.

While he was in the United States, Soebardjo had also negotiated a $50 million (equivalent to $620 million in 2025) loan for Indonesia with U.S. Secretary of State Dean Acheson and obtained Indonesian eligibility to receive economic and technical aid. In January 1952, Soebardjo corresponded in secret with U.S. Ambassador H. Merle Cochran on American aid, and Soebardjo committed to following the terms of the aid laid out in the U.S. Mutual Security Act of 1951. He did this without prior approval from the cabinet – including the minister of defense, while the terms included military obligations. (Note: The Mutual Security Act allowed for aid without military obligations, but would not enable Indonesia to purchase military equipment from the U.S. or Europe.)

When the cabinet learned of the terms in February, Soebardjo was instructed to amend the agreement, but as negotiations continued the Indonesian press strongly attacked the Soekiman government on the issue. A parliamentary motion quickly passed which required parliamentary ratification of all foreign treaties. Another parliamentary motion was initiated by the Great Indonesia Unity Party (PIR). PIR members accused Soebardjo of pushing Indonesia "under the American sphere of influence". (Note: PIR was part of the government coalition, represented by defense minister Sewaka.) Although Cochran showed some flexibility for negotiations, pressure on the cabinet intensified, leading to Soebardjo's resignation as minister on 21 February and the cabinet's collapse on 23 February. The succeeding government would ultimately accept U.S. aid without associated military assistance or obligations.

=== In Switzerland ===
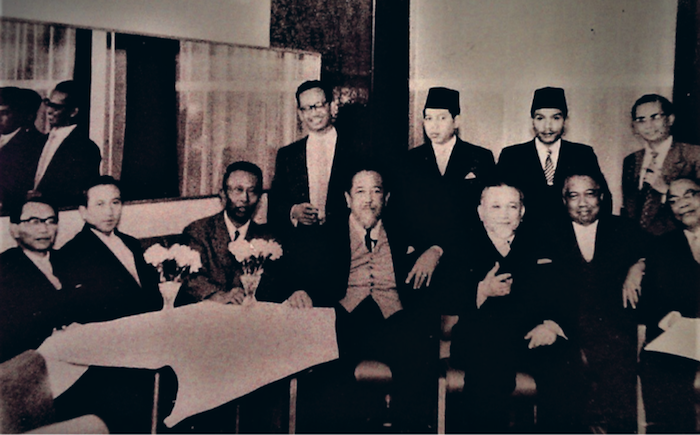
The Indonesian delegation at UNCLOS I. Soebardjo is in the first row, third from right.

After his second term, Soebardjo resumed his role as a foreign ministry advisor, and served as ADLN's director in 1953–1954. Until July 1957, he also served as head of the ministry's directorate for the Americas. Soebardjo was then appointed as Indonesia's ambassador to Switzerland, and presented his credentials in September 1957. Previously the mission was a legation headed by chargé d'affaires Raden Panji Subechi, and Soebardjo would serve in this posting until 8 May 1961. The PRRI rebellion in Indonesia broke out during this term, and Indonesian ambassador to Italy Sutan Mohammad Rasjid resigned from his post to join the revolt. Rasjid received political asylum in Switzerland, and Soebardjo lodged a "half-hearted" protest in December 1958 when Rasjid began fundraising for PRRI from Switzerland. The Swiss federal government noted that this protest was issued as matter of form, and assessed Soebardjo as also being sympathetic to the PRRI's cause.

During his ambassadorship, Soebardjo also led the Indonesian delegations to the first two United Nations Conventions on the Law of the Sea (UNCLOS) in 1958 and 1960, both held in Geneva. As chief delegate, Soebardjo reiterated the Indonesian doctrine of the status of Indonesia's internal waters as territorial waters as declared in 1957 by Prime Minister Djuanda Kartawidjaja. This position was opposed by a number of countries including the United States and the United Kingdom, which considered Indonesian internal waters as "high seas formerly freely used for centuries". Soebardjo, in turn, argued against a uniform standard for territorial waters for all countries.

Indonesia failed to achieve its intended goals in the 1958 Convention, and Foreign Minister Ruslan Abdulgani argued to Soebardjo that "it was still unnecessary to commit diplomatic energy" to push for the doctrine's acceptance. Soebardjo would again push for Indonesian territorial water claims at the 1960 conference, pushing for the 12-mile limit. He was succeeded as ambassador by Mohammad Nazir Isa.

== Later career and death ==
After his return from Switzerland, Soebardjo joined the Supreme Advisory Council where he sat until 1965. He also continued to work with the foreign ministry as an advisor until his retirement in 1968. He lectured for a time at the University of Indonesia's history department and in 1974 became part of a five-man commission (containing him, Hatta, A. A. Maramis, A. G. Pringgodigdo, and Soenario) tasked by president Suharto to compose the history of Pancasila. He was also chair of the Indonesian Institute for International Affairs (Lembaga Indonesia untuk Urusan-Urusan Internasional), and in 1978 he attended a special session of the United Nations on disarmament in this capacity. He wrote two autobiographies, published in 1972 and 1978.

He died on 15 December 1978 at the Pertamina Central Hospital, Jakarta due to a complications from a flu. Soebardjo was buried in a military funeral led by former armed forces commander Maraden Panggabean in the front yard of his villa in Cipayung, Bogor Regency.

== Legacy and honors ==
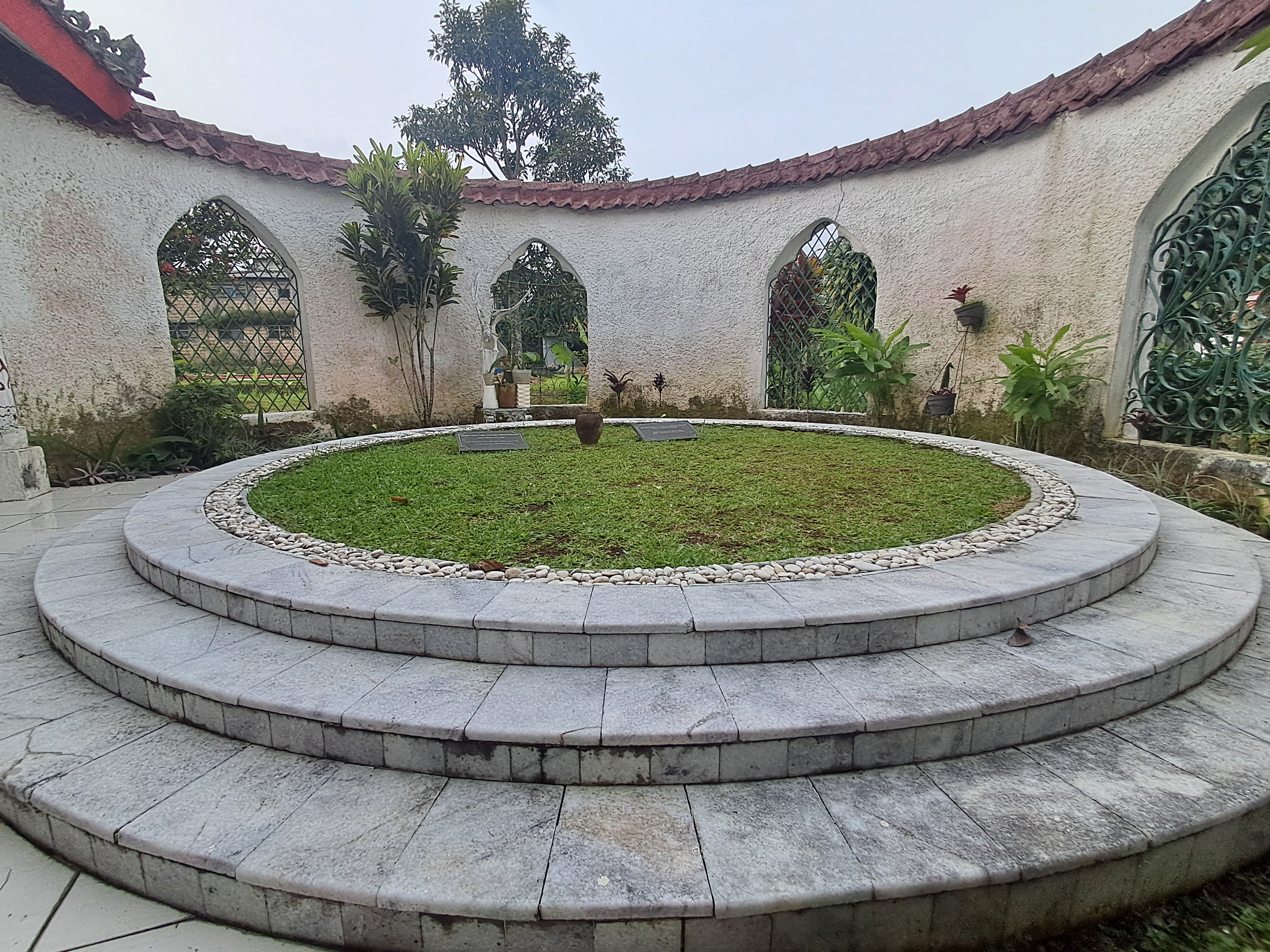
The grave of Soebardjo and his wife.

Contemporaries and historians described Soebardjo as a complex politician. American OSS intelligence officer Paul Kattenburg in his 1946 report described Soebardjo as "an ambitious nationalist". Hubertus van Mook, the Dutch governor-general of Indonesia during the revolution, disparagingly referred to Soebardjo as "a weak and dark figure [...] with one leg in every group". Several historians, Indonesian and foreign, described Soebardjo as a non-ideologue. Contemporary nationalist B.M. Diah noted Soebardjo's unwavering commitment to the nationalist cause.

He had received the Star of Mahaputera, 2nd Class in 1973, and was posthumously awarded the Star of the Republic of Indonesia in 1992. On 6 November 2009, he was declared a National Hero of Indonesia by President Susilo Bambang Yudhoyono. As of 2025, there have been calls by culturalists from Soebardjo's hometown of Karawang to name roads or government buildings in his honor. A building at the Foreign Affairs Ministry's training complex is named after him.

His house in Cikini was recognized as the Indonesian foreign ministry's first office. The house was previously owned by a Dutch person, who was arrested by Japanese occupation forces in 1942, and Soebardjo moved in with his family that year. In 2021, Soebardjo's eldest daughter Laksmi Pudjiwati Insia announced that the family would be putting the house up for sale due to the family's inability to maintain its condition. In August 2024, the house was formally made a cultural property after it was sold and converted to a contemporary art gallery opened in July 2025.

== Personal life and family ==
Soebardjo spoke nine languages, including French, German, Greek, and Latin. He was a fan of classical music, a violin player, and a cigar smoker. Subadio Sastrosatomo described Soebardjo as a bohemian.

Shortly after his return to Indonesia in 1934, Soebardjo married Raden Ayu Poedji Astuti, a daughter of the regent of Kebumen. The couple had two daughters and three sons. Astuti was buried next to Soebardjo upon her death.

Political offices
Preceded by N/A	Foreign Minister of Indonesia; 1945	Succeeded by Sutan Sjahrir
Preceded by Mohammad Roem	Foreign Minister of Indonesia; 1951–1952	Succeeded by Wilopo
