= Proclamation of Indonesian Independence =

1945 Indonesian independence document

- Part of the Indonesian National Revolution
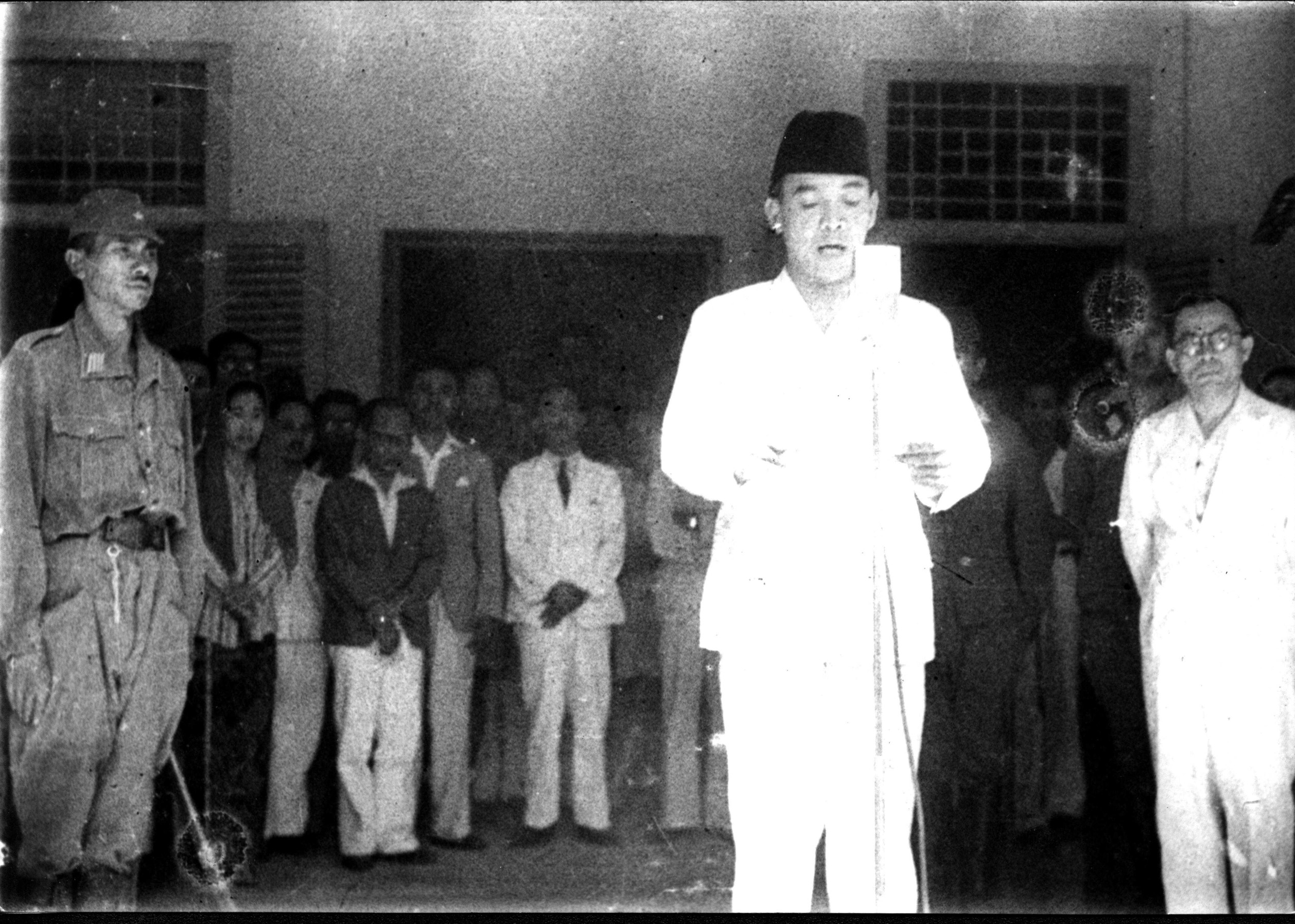
- Sukarno, accompanied by Mohammad Hatta (right), proclaiming the independence of Indonesia.
- Native name: Proklamasi Kemerdekaan Indonesia
- English name: Proclamation of Indonesian Independence
- Date: 17 August 1945; 81 years ago
- Time: 10:00 a.m. JST (UTC+9)
- Venue: Sukarno's house at 56 Jalan Pegangsaan Timur (now Taman Proklamasi)
- Location: Jakarta, Japanese-occupied Dutch East Indies → Republic of Indonesia
- Participants: Signatories: Sukarno; Mohammad Hatta; And members of the: PPKI
- This event marked the history of the Republic of Indonesia and celebrated as a ceremony.

The Proclamation of Indonesian Independence (Indonesian: Proklamasi Kemerdekaan Indonesia, or simply Proklamasi) was read at 10:00 Tokyo Standard Time on Friday, 17 August 1945 in Jakarta. The declaration marked the start of the diplomatic and armed resistance of the Indonesian National Revolution, fighting against the forces of the Netherlands and pro-Dutch civilians, until the latter officially acknowledged Indonesia's independence in 1949. The document was signed by Sukarno and Mohammad Hatta, who were appointed president and vice-president respectively the following day.

The date of the Proclamation of Indonesian Independence was made a public holiday by a government decree issued on 18 June 1946.. On 14 June 2023, the Netherlands recognised 17 August 1945 as Indonesian independence day, while still maintaining that the official transfer of sovereignty took place in 1949.

== Background ==
=== The beginnings of the independence movement ===
In 1918, the Dutch authorities in the Dutch East Indies established a partly-elected People's Council, the Volksraad, which for the first time gave Indonesian nationalists a voice. Meanwhile, Indonesian students studying in the Netherlands formed the Perhimpoenan Indonesia, or Indonesian Association. Among its leaders were future Indonesian vice-president Mohammad Hatta and future prime minister Sutan Sjahrir. In September 1927, Hatta and other members were arrested for inciting resistance to Dutch authority in the East Indies, but thanks to a rousing defense speech by Hatta, they were acquitted. Back in the East Indies, in 1927, nationalist and future Indonesian president Sukarno turned his study club into the Indonesian Nationalist Association, which in May 1928 became the Indonesian National Party (PNI). The party aimed to achieve Indonesian independence through mass-based non-cooperation with the authorities. In October 1928, the representatives at a Youth Congress held in Batavia, the capital, adopted the ideals of one motherland, Indonesia; one nation, the nation of Indonesia; and one language, the Indonesian language. This expression of national unity was a reaction to the older generation, which tended to identify with their region or ethnicity, and subsequently became known as the Youth Pledge.

=== The pre-war period ===
The PNI grew rapidly, causing concern for the authorities, who arrested Sukarno and seven party leaders in December 1929. They were put on trial for being a threat to public order and in September 1930 received sentences of one to four years – Sukarno received the longest sentence. The PNI dissolved itself in 1931, and in the same year, Sjahrir returned from the Netherlands and established a party called the New PNI which rather than focusing on mass action and being dependent on one leader, aimed to create a group of leaders who could ensure continuity if any were arrested. In 1931, Sukarno was released and joined the small Indonesia Party (Partindo), while in August 1932, Hatta returned from the Netherlands and assumed the leadership of the rival New PNI, which had a more Marxist and revolutionary platform than Partindo. Sukarno was arrested again in August 1933, and was exiled first to Flores, then to Bencoolen, while Hatta and Sjahrir were arrested and exiled to the Boven Digul detention camp in western New Guinea.

The detention of these nationalist figures effectively ended the non-cooperation movement, and in December 1935 the moderate Indonesian National Union and Budi Utomo merged to form the Great Indonesia Party (Parindra), which aimed to work with the Dutch to achieve Indonesian independence. When in 1936, Volksraad member Soetardjo submitted a petition asking for a conference to be held that would lead to Indonesian self-government as part of a Dutch-Indonesian union over a decade, Parindra was lukewarm, resenting the possibility of Soetardjo succeeding where the other nationalist organizations had failed. The petition was passed by a majority of the Volksraad, but rejected by the Dutch in November 1938. In May 1937, Parindra, the Indonesian People's Movement (Gerindo), was established by younger Marxists including Amir Sjarifuddin, another future prime minister, to campaign for the formation of an Indonesian parliament in cooperation with the Dutch, which was the same aim of the Indonesian Political Federation (GAPI), formed two years later from a merger of almost all the nationalist organizations. However, the outbreak of the Second World War resulted in the occupation of the Netherlands, and the Dutch government in exile was in no position to respond to GAPI's request for a Dutch-Indonesian union and an elected legislature, although Dutch Queen Wilhelmina made a speech in London in May 1941 promising unspecified changes to the relationship with the East Indies after the war.

On 23 January 1942, three years before the 1945 proclamation, an independence activist Nani Wartabone declared "Indonesian independence" after he and his people won in a revolt in Gorontalo against the Dutch who were afraid of Japanese invasion of Celebes. He was later imprisoned by the Japanese after they had invaded the area.

=== The Japanese occupation ===
==== Early years ====
With the outbreak of the war in the Far East, and the initial successes of Japan, in early 1942, the Dutch authorities gave Amir Sjarifuddin money to establish an underground resistance movement and sent Hatta and Sjahrir back to Java. In January 1942, the Japanese invaded the Dutch East Indies, and rapidly overran the archipelago. The Dutch surrendered on 8 March. The Japanese banned the use of the Dutch language as well as the Indonesian flag and anthem, and the Japanese calendar was imposed. The archipelago was administered as three separate regions: Sumatra by the Twenty-Fifth Army, Java and Madura by the Sixteenth Army and Kalimantan and the resource-rich eastern islands by the Imperial Japanese Navy. As the area controlled by the Navy was the source of essential supplies, including food, to the other areas, rear-admiral Tadashi Maeda was appointed to the liaison office of the naval attaché in Batavia to expedite deliveries and to ensure the maintenance of good relations with the Army.

In April 1943, the Japanese established the Triple-A mass movement. Its name was taken from the Japanese propaganda slogan portraying Japan as the leader, protector and light of Asia. However, it failed to gain support as no significant Indonesian nationalists were involved, and the propaganda was too heavy-handed. The Japanese then decided that it would be more effective to use the pre-war nationalists to mobilize the population in support of their war aims. In July, the 25th Army freed Sukarno from exile in Sumatra, and he joined Hatta and Sjahrir in Jakarta, as Batavia had been renamed. They agreed that Sjahrir would work underground, while Sukarno and Hatta would cooperate with the Japanese, still with the ultimate goal of Indonesian independence. The two men urged the Japanese to establish a popular political organization that they would lead, and this came about in March 1943 with the formation of Putera, the Centre of People's Power. Although it was controlled by the Japanese, it was led by Sukarno, Hatta, Hajar Dewantara and pre-war Islamic figure Mas Mansoer. Like the Triple A, it achieved very little.

==== Japanese support for Indonesian nationalism ====
As the tide turned against Japan and its territorial expansion halted, Japan started to talk of greater Indonesian involvement in the governance of Java, where the 16th Army was much more in favor of such participation than the 25th Army or the Navy in other parts of the archipelago. A Central Advisory Council was established, again headed by Sukarno, and more Indonesians were appointed as advisors to the Japanese. In October 1943, the Japanese formed the Defenders of the Homeland (PETA) volunteer army intended to help fight off an allied invasion of the East Indies, and also established the Council of Indonesian Muslim Associations (Masjumi) as an umbrella group for Muslims. In 1944, Putera was dissolved and replaced by the Java Service Association (Jawa Hokokai), with Sukarno and Hatta given key positions in it, albeit answering to the military governor. Although intended to mobilise the masses for Japanese interests, Sukarno in particular took advantage of his role to tour the archipelago making speeches.

On 7 September 1944, Japanese Prime Minister Kuniaki Koiso promised independence for the 'East Indies' "later on" (di kemudian hari). The authorities in Java then allowed the flying of the Indonesian flag at Jawa Hokokai buildings. Rear-admiral Maeda provided official funds for tours around the archipelago by Sukarno and Hatta, and in October 1944, established a Free Indonesia Dormitory to prepare youth leaders for an independent Indonesia. With the war situation becoming increasingly dire, in March 1945 the Japanese announced the formation of an Investigating Committee for Preparatory Work for Independence (BPUPK), comprising members of the older political generation, including Sukarno and Hatta. Chaired by Rajiman Wediodiningrat, in two sessions in May and June, it decided on the basis for an independent nation and produced a draft constitution. Meanwhile, the younger activists, known as the pemuda, wanted much more overt moves towards independence than the older generation were willing to risk, resulting in a split between the generations.

==== Japanese plan for independence ====
Following the call from the allies for Japan to surrender, the Japanese decided to grant Indonesian independence to create problems for the Dutch when they reoccupied their colony. At a meeting in Singapore at the end of July, it was decided that Java would become independent at the end of September, followed by other areas. On 6 and 9 August, atomic bombs were dropped on Hiroshima and Nagasaki. On 7 August, the Japanese announced the formation of a Preparatory Committee for Indonesian Independence (PPKI) to accelerate preparations for establishing an Indonesian government for the whole of the East Indies, not just Java. Two days later, Sukarno, Hatta and Rajiman Wediodiningrat were flown by the Japanese to Dalat, near Saigon, to meet with Field Marshall Hisaichi Terauchi, the Japanese commander of the Southern Expeditionary Army Group, who promised independence for the territory of the former Dutch East Indies and formally appointed Sukarno and Hatta as chairman and vice-chairman of the PPKI. On 15 August, Japan surrendered, and the Japanese authorities in the East Indies were ordered to maintain the status quo pending the arrival of allied forces. However there was no official confirmation from the Japanese of the surrender. Again there was disagreement between the older generation, including Sukarno and Hatta, who were uncertain how to proceed, and the pemuda, including Sjahrir, who urged Sukarno to declare independence without the involvement of the PPKI to avoid accusations from the Allies that independence was sponsored by Japan. In the afternoon of 15 August, Sukarno, Hatta and BPUPK member and future foreign minister Achmad Soebardjo called on Maeda to ask about the surrender rumours, and received unofficial confirmation that they were true. Hatta then asked Soebardjo to arrange a meeting of the PPKI for the following day and went home to draft a proclamation.

Meanwhile, various pemuda groups had heard the surrender rumors and held a meeting. Those present included D. N. Aidit, Chairul Saleh and Wikana. They decided to send a deputation led by Wikana to meet Sukarno at his home and demand an immediate proclamation of independence in person, rather than through the PPKI, which they saw as having no credibility, and which in any case had no pemuda members. In an angry exchange, Sukarno refused to do so as besides the need to discuss matters with the PPKI, he did not want to provoke the Japanese. Hatta subsequently arrived and took the same stance as Sukarno, and pointed out that there was still no official confirmation of the Japanese surrender. He then invited the pemuda to go ahead with a proclamation themselves. Wikana in turn demanded a declaration the following day, 16 August, and the delegation left.

Wikana felt humiliated by the challenge from Hatta as he knew that only Sukarno and Hatta had the authority to make a credible declaration of independence. Spurred on by this humiliation and the desire to demonstrate the commitment of the pemuda, a decision was taken by a group including Chairul Saleh and Wikana to take action. In the early hours of the morning of 16 August, they took Sukarno and Hatta to the town of Rengasdengklok (today in Karawang Regency, West Java), ostensibly to protect them from an uprising by Peta troops, but in fact to force them to declare independence. However, the two men still refused to make such a proclamation without assurances from the Japanese. Later that morning, Maeda learned that Sukarno and Hatta had disappeared. An Army investigation led to Wikana, who was pressured to return the two men to Jakarta. Following a guarantee of safety and cooperation from Maeda, as well as the use of his house for discussions, Subardjo went to Rengasdengklok and brought Sukarno and Hatta back to Jakarta. They obtained an assurance from the Japanese military that there would be no interference in a declaration of independence as long as it was not associated with the Japanese, as this would be a breach of the surrender terms. Sukarno and Hatta then went to Maeda's house, now the Formulation of Proclamation Text Museum, where members of the PPKI were waiting, having been told to go there by Subardjo.

== The writing of the proclamation ==
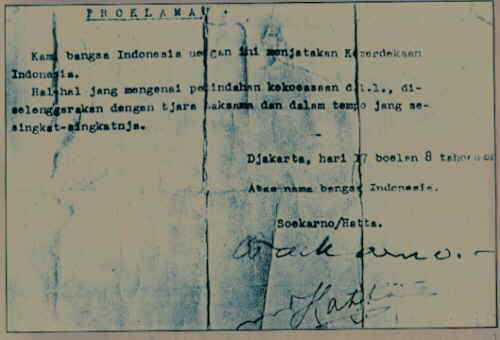
The original Indonesian proclamation of Independence

Earlier that day, the pemuda led by Sjahrir had produced a declaration worded as follows:

The Indonesian people hereby declares its independence. All existing governmental organs shall be seized by the people from the foreigners who still control them.

Sukarno and Hatta rejected this wording, believing that it had the potential to spark violence and would cause problems for the Japanese as it implied a transfer of sovereignty in violation of the terms of the surrender. Sukarno drafted the final version, which read as follows:

We the people of Indonesia hereby declare the independence of Indonesia. Matters concerning the transfer of power and other matters will be executed in an orderly manner and in the shortest possible time.

This final version contained the phrase "transfer of power", which was acceptable to the Japanese as the Japanese language translation of the phrase implied transfer of administrative control, rather than of sovereignty, which could have been seen as a violation by the Japanese of the ceasefire commitment to preserve the status quo. It was also acceptable to the Indonesians, who could interpret this transfer in a wider sense. Meanwhile, the phrase "in an orderly manner" reassured the older nationalists as it implied no action by the pemuda, and "in the shortest possible time" was taken by the Indonesians to mean before the Allied forces arrived. Chairul Saleh and other pemuda figures protested ineffectually about the changes, but the majority of the PPKI agreed with the wording. After some debate as to who would sign the proclamation, it was agreed that in order to disassociate the document from the Japanese-formed PPKI, only Sukarno and Hatta would sign it. The meeting adjourned at 5:00 am.

The Latin-alphabet typewriter used to produce the proclamation text was borrowed from Korvettenkapitän Dr.jur. Hermann Kandeler, the leader of a Nazi German military stützpunkt in Pasar Senen, Jakarta. This was because only Japanese typewriters were available in Maeda's house.

== The ceremony ==
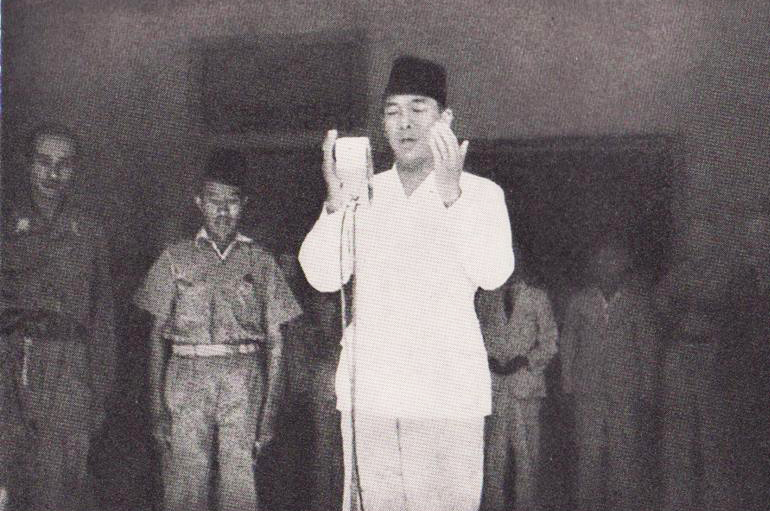
Sukarno praying before proclaiming the independence of Indonesia

The original plan was for the proclamation to be read in public before a crowd at the square in the center of Jakarta, now Merdeka Square. However, Japanese authorities, fearing disorder, deployed soldiers to the area, and so the proclamation ceremony was moved to Sukarno's house at 56 Jalan Pegangsaan Timur at 10 am Japan Standard Time, which was in use during the occupation.

The brief ceremony was very simple. Firstly, the preamble to the draft constitution, which had been written by the BPUPK, was read; then, Sukarno, with Hatta by his side, read the proclamation text:

P R O K L A M A S I

Kami, bangsa Indonesia, dengan ini menjatakan kemerdekaan Indonesia.

Hal-hal jang mengenai pemindahan kekoeasaan d.l.l., diselenggarakan dengan tjara saksama dan dalam tempo jang sesingkat-singkatnja.

Djakarta, hari 17 boelan 8 tahoen 05

Atas nama bangsa Indonesia,

Soekarno/Hatta.

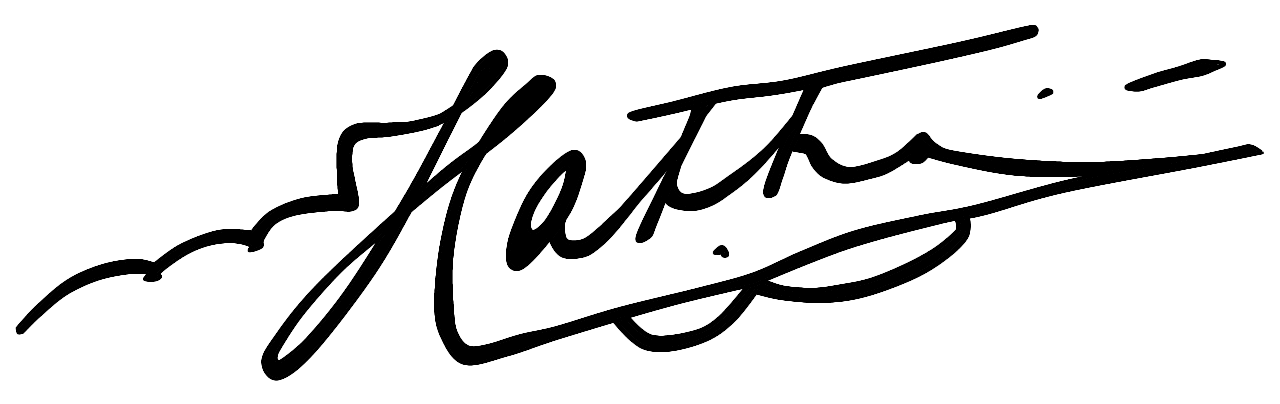

PETA officer Latief Hendraningat raised the red-and-white flag of Indonesia and attendees sang the Indonesian national anthem, Indonesia Raya.

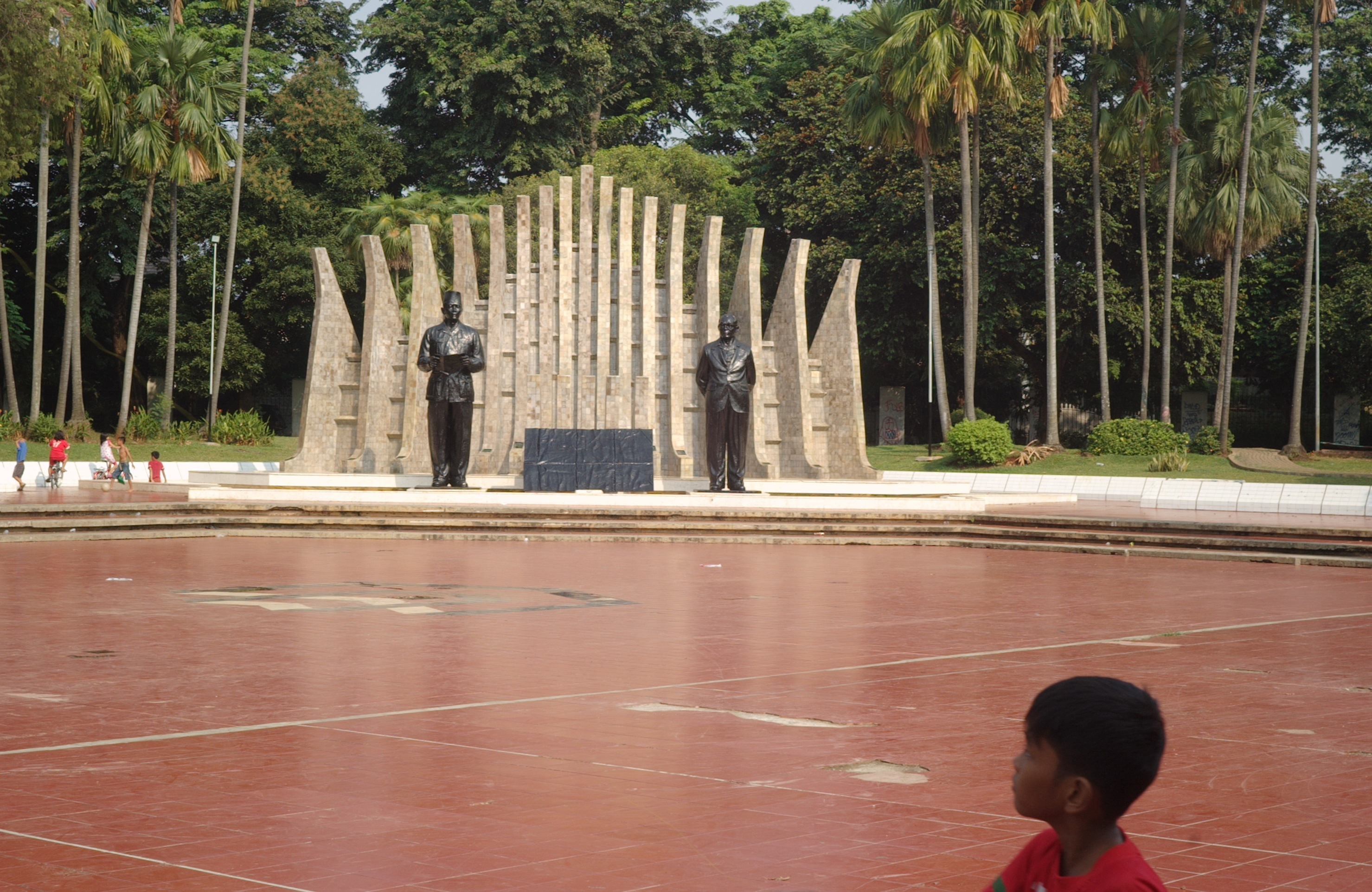
Children playing in Proclamation Park, the site of the 1945 Indonesian proclamation of independence; monument designed by Nyoman Nuarta

Sukarno reading the proclamation. This recording was made in 1950 or 1951, not 1945.

=== English translation ===
An English translation published by the Ministry of Foreign Affairs in October 1948 consisted of the entire speech as read by Sukarno. It included remarks made immediately prior to and after the actual proclamation. George McTurnan Kahin, a historian on Indonesia, believed these were omitted from publication in Indonesia, either due to Japanese control of media outlets or fear of provoking a harsh Japanese response.

Proclamation

We the people of Indonesia do hereby declare the independence of Indonesia. Matters concerning the transfer of power and other matters will be executed in an orderly manner and in the shortest possible time.

Djakarta, 17 August 05

In the name of the people of Indonesia

Soekarno/Hatta

The date of the declaration, "05" refers to "Japanese imperial year (皇紀, kōki) 2605".

== Aftermath ==
Indonesian youths spread news of the proclamation across Java almost immediately using Japanese news and telegraph facilities, and in Bandung the news was broadcast by radio. However, many ordinary Indonesians either did not believe the reports or saw them as Japanese deception. In Sumatra, only the republican elite in major cities knew of the proclamation by mid-September.

The day after the proclamation ceremony, the Preparatory Committee for Indonesian Independence met and elected Sukarno as president and Hatta as vice-president. It also ratified the Constitution of Indonesia. The Dutch, as the former colonial power, viewed the republicans as collaborators with the Japanese, and desired to restore their colonial rule as they still had political and economic interests in the former Dutch East Indies. This triggered a four-year war for Indonesian independence. Indonesian youths had played an important role in the proclamation, and they played a central role in the Indonesian National Revolution. One of the other changes that had also taken place during the Japanese occupation included the population in Indonesia undertaking military training. Conflict occurred not only with the Dutch, but also when the Japanese tried to re-establish control in October 1945 in Bandung, and furthermore when the British tried to establish control. After a long struggle, Indonesia gained freedom from the Netherlands in 1949 as a part of wider decolonization in Asia.
