= Oey Tiang Tjoei =

Portrait of Oey.

Oey Tiang Tjoei (Chinese: 黄長水; 1893 – 1977) was an Indonesian journalist, known for being a member of the Investigating Committee for Preparatory Work for Independence. Prior to the Pacific War, he was a prominent supporter of Japanese Pan-Asianism.

== Biography ==
Oey was born in Batavia on 1893, and he received a Dutch education. He later became influenced by Japanese Pan-Asianism, and joined the Hoo Hap secret society where he was its leader in the 1930s. In 1939, he joined the newly formed Hong Po newspaper as a director. With the Second Sino-Japanese War then ongoing, most Chinese Indonesian newspapers at that time actively raised funds for war victims and adopted an anti-Japanese stance. Hong Po, however, was strongly pro-Japan. Due to this, a competing Chinese Indonesian newspaper, Keng Po, nicknamed it Bohong Po ("News of Lies"). Oei took the nickname as an insult, and he physically assaulted Keng Po's editor in response.

Following the attack on Pearl Harbor in December 1941, Oey was arrested for his pro-Japanese sentiment by the Dutch authorities. During his incarceration, Oey published his memoirs. He was freed from prison following the Japanese takeover. Due to his prewar stance, the Japanese authorities appointed him into several positions, including heading the Kakyo Sokai (Chinese association) and directing the Malay language version of the newspaper Kung Yung Pao. He was additionally appointed into the Central Advisory Council, and later in 1945 as a member of the Investigating Committee for Preparatory Work for Independence to represent the Chinese community in West Java. Despite being Kakyo Sokai's leader, however, he was not appointed into the smaller Preparatory Committee for Indonesian Independence, the more junior Yap Tjwan Bing being appointed as the group's sole Chinese Indonesian member instead.

After the surrender of Japan, Oey was detained by arriving British soldiers and faded into obscurity. He died in Jakarta in 1977, and his body was cremated.
