= Sovereignty Party =

Sovereignty Party Partai Kedaulatan
- Chairman: Denny Mochtar Chillah
- Secretary-General: Eddy Martin Ilyas
- Founder: Ibrahim Basrah
- Founded: 4 October 2006 (first incarnation); 14 August 2022 (second incarnation)
- Dissolved: 10 March 2013
- Merged into: People's Conscience Party
- Headquarters: Kebon Sirih Barat I No. 66 Menteng, Central Jakarta, 10340
- Ideology: Pancasila; Populism

Website
- www.partaikedaulatan.org

The Sovereignty Party (Indonesian: Partai Kedaulatan) was a political party in Indonesia and a contestant in the 2009 elections.

== Background ==
The party was established in Jakarta on 2 October 2006 following a deep study of article 1 of the Constitution of Indonesia, which states that sovereignty is in the hands of the people and is exercised according to the Constitution. Membership was open to all Indonesian citizens, regardless of race, ethnicity, religion, profession, social status or gender.

== Party Philosophy ==
The party had a vision to bring about an Indonesian nation that is sovereign, has a religious and nationalistic perspective, that is strong and prosperous and that has an equal standing in the international community. It aimed to be a party that was the choice of the people and that was consistent in struggling for and prioritizing their rights and sovereignty as expressed in the Constitution of Indonesia. Other policies included support for the 30% minimum of female legislative candidates in the interest of gender equality, transparency in governance and regional autonomy in the management of natural resources. In order to avoid national disintegration. It was reported to be close to former Jakarta governor Sutiyoso, a candidate in the 2009 Indonesian presidential election and considered him as a presidential candidate

In the 2009 elections, the party won only 0.4 percent of the vote, less than the 2.5 percent electoral threshold, meaning it was awarded no seats in the People's Representative Council. The party intended to contest the 2014 elections, but failed to fulfill the criteria set by the General Elections Commission, and along with nine other parties which also failed to qualify, decided to merge into the People's Conscience Party (Hanura).

== Election results ==
=== Presidential election results ===
Election	Ballot number	Candidate	Running mate	1st round (Total votes)	Share of votes	Outcome	2nd round (Total votes)	Share of votes	Outcome
2009	1	Megawati Sukarnoputri	Prabowo Subianto	32,548,105	26.79%	Lost			

=== Legislative election results ===
Election	Ballot number	Leader	Seats		Votes		Status
Election	Ballot number	Leader	No.	±	Total	%	Status
2009	11	Ibrahim Basrah	0 / 560		438,030	0.42%	Opposition
