= Central Advisory Council =

Institutions used to run Java and Sumatra during Japanese occupation

The Central Advisory Council (Japanese: 中央参議院, Hepburn: Chūō Sangiin; Kunrei-shiki: Tyuuoo Sangiin, lit. 'Central House of Councillors', Indonesian: Dewan Pertimbangan Pusat) was the name given to bodies established by the Japanese military administration in Java and Sumatra in 1943 during the Japanese occupation of the Dutch East Indies to notionally provide Indonesians with popular representation.

== Background ==
In early 1942, the Japanese invaded the Dutch East Indies, overrunning the archipelago in less than two months. The Dutch in Java surrendered on March 8. Initially, Indonesians welcomed the Japanese as liberators from the colonial regime. The Japanese divided the countries into three regions: Sumatra was under the 25th Army, Java and Madura under the 16th Army and Borneo and eastern Indonesia were controlled by Imperial Japanese Navy. The Japanese came to realize that if they wanted to exploit the nation's resources, they would have to give something back to the people in return, especially given the repressive nature of the occupation regime. The administration therefore decided to work with prominent Indonesian nationalists, including Sukarno - who the Japanese freed from the exile imposed by the Dutch - and Mohammed Hatta. The Japanese promised self-government in the future, and established a nationalist organization called Centre of People's Power (Indonesian: Poesat Tenaga Rakyat, Poetra (old spelling) Pusat Tenaga Rakyat, Putra (current spelling), Japanese: 民衆総力結集運動, romanized: minshū sōryoku kesshū undō). The new body was headed by Sukarno, Hatta, Ki Hajar Dewantara and Mas Mansoer. The Japanese then appointed more advisers and on 15 September 1943, established the Central Advisory Council in Java, chaired by Sukarno. Sessions of the CAC were held in the same building that had been used by the Volksraad in Pejambon, central Jakarta. It is now known as the Pancasila Building.

== Aims and role ==
The Central Advisory Council was even less powerful than the pre-war body set up by the Dutch, the Volksraad, as it was not allowed to criticize the government. Its role was limited to answering questions asked of it by the military administration, which were in practice only related to practical ways to ensuring greater assistance from the local population in the Japanese war effort. The council would then propose practical steps to ensure total mobilisation. In the view of the Japanese, the council would encourage the people of Java and Madura to take responsibility for their lives in accordance with the wishes of the Japanese. The subjects it was allowed to discuss were:

- the development of the government
- improvements to standards of living
- education and information
- industry and the economy
- welfare and social assistance
- health

== Java Central Advisory Council ==
Central Advisory Council (Java)
- 中央参議院 (Chūō Sangiin), Dewan Pertimbangan Pusat

Agency overview
- Formed: 15 September 1943
- Dissolved: 21 June 1945
- Jurisdiction: 16th Army command
- Headquarters: Jakarta
- Employees: 57

=== Membership of Java Central Advisory Council ===
Members were either appointed by the 16th Army commander (23 members) or elected by and from regional representative councils (Japanese: 州参議会, romanized: Shū Sangi-kai), 18 members from special municipality representative councils (Japanese: 特別市参議会, romanized: Tokubetsu-shi Sangi-kai) and 2 members from special region (Japanese: 公地, romanized: kōchi, kooti) councils . Many of them had been members of nationalist organizations and/or the Volksraad. Prominent members included Sukarno, Hatta, Ki Hajar Dewantara, Mas Mansoer and Rajiman Wediodiningrat. The council also had a secretariat (Japanese: 事務局, romanized: jimukyoku, zimukyoku) comprising Javanese and Japanese members. The head as well as the two deputy heads were appointed directly by the head of the military administration. Following 7 September 1944 promise of future independence for the Dutch East Indies, 14 new members were appointed. The members were:

==== Appointed by the Japanese military administration of Java ====
- Abdul Wahid Hasyim
- Abikusno Tjokrosujoso
- Ario Woerjaningrat
- Bendoro P. Ario Soerjodiningrat
- Gatot Mangkupradja
- Margono Djojohadikoesoemo
- Mohammad Djamin
- Pandji Soeroso
- Samsoedin
- Soedjono
- Sukarjo Wiryopranoto
- Soemanang
- Sukarno

Additional members appointed in 1943:

- Abdurrahman Baswedan
- Alexander A. Maramis
- Johannes Latuharhary
- Mas Goenari
- Muhammad Yamin
- Oekar Bratakoesoema
- P. F. Dahler
- Prawoto Soemodilogo
- Roedjito
- Wiwoho Poerbohadidjojo
- Yap Tjwan Bing

==== Elected by regional advisory councils ====
- Adipati Sosrodiningrat (Solo)
- Bandoro P. Ario Poeroebojo (Jogjakarta)
- Fatchoerrahman (Bodjonegoro)
- Ibrahim Singadilaga (Djakarta)
- M. A. Sofwan (Djakarta Raya)
- M. Soetisna Sendjaja (Priangan)
- Maas (Pekalongan)
- Marzoeki Mahdi (Bogor)
- Mas Aris (Pati)
- Mohamad Toha (Tjirebon)
- Poero Martodipoero (Kediri)
- R. Z. Soeriakartalegawa (Banten)
- Sardjito Kartomihardjo (Kedu)
- Sardjono Danoedibroto (Banjumas)
- Soejoedi (Semarang)
- Soenarko (Malang)
- Soerjonegoro (Madura)
- Wediodiningrat (Madiun)

Additional members appointed in 1943:

- Asmo Asmodisastro (Besuki)
- R. Soedirman (Surabaja)

=== Java Central Advisory Council Sessions ===
==== First Session (October 16–20, 1943) ====
The first question from the Japanese commander-in-chief was, "What are the practical ways to strengthen the local people's cooperation in the Greater East Asia War". It was sent to the Council members on 5 October 1943, following which the secretariat and a number of members produced draft responses.

Only one day of the five-day session was spent discussing the question and producing a reply. It began with an expression of thanks from the Japanese for the willingness of the Indonesians to cooperate with the military regime. On October 17, Sukarno was appointed chairman while R.M.A.A. Koesoemo Oetojo and Boentaran Martoatmodjo were appointed vice-chairmen. All three were inaugurated by the head of the secretariat. The commander-in-chief's question was discussed on October 18, with members divided into four committees, discussing various aspects such as mobilisation of people and increasing production. Each committee submitted a draft response, with no major changes to those produced in the pre-sessional discussions, and all were unanimously accepted on 19 October. The closing ceremony was held the following day. The session thus proceeded entirely in line with the Japanese plan.

After this session, on November 10, a delegation from the Central Advisory Council comprising Sukarno, Hatta and Bagoes Hadikoesoemo left for Tokyo. They had been invited to Japan to thank the Hirohito for his generosity in giving the Indonesians the opportunity to work with the military administration. The delegation arrived on November 15. The following day the three men were decorated by the emperor. In a meeting with Japanese Prime minister Tojo, Sukarno asked for the ban on the Indonesian flag and the national anthem to be lifted and was told that the Japanese would consider these demands once they had won the war.

==== Second Session (January 30 - February 3, 1944) ====
This session discussed the question from the Japanese military commander regarding practical ways the people of Java could organize their strength to be ready for victorious battle.

==== Third Session (7 - 11 May 1944) ====
The question for this session was how to raise the awareness of the people regarding their obligations as well as to strengthen friendly cooperation regardless of nationality, work or rank. Five of the members proposed extensive military training for the people using real weapons, instead of the bamboo spears and wooden knives that had been used to date, but the authorities were unable to grant this.

==== Fourth Session (August 12–16, 1944) ====
In July 1944, Saipan was captured by the Allies. Sinkings of Japanese shipping led to shortages in Java and the military commander ordered the Central Advisory Council to meet to discuss the question of how to increase the workforce, defend the nation and increase production.

==== Fifth (Special) Session (September 11, 1944) ====
In August 1944, the war situation worsened further for Japan, with the loss of the Solomon Islands and the Marshall Islands. Prime Minister Tojo resigned and was replaced by Kuniaki Koiso. On September 7, Koiso promised independence for the 'East Indies' "later on" (di kemudian hari). The next day, the Japanese military commander ordered special session of the Central Advisory Council to discus the question of how the Indonesian people could prove their gratitude to the Japanese government and how to awaken the enthusiasm of the people to destroy the United States and Britain.

==== Sixth Session (November 12–17, 1944) ====
This session was attended by a large number of Japanese officials and civilians as well as journalists. The question under discussion was how to obtain real results in concentrating the strength of every person to wage war and what must be done to improve living standards as the war reaches a zenith.

==== Seventh Session (February 21–26, 1945) ====
The war situation continued to worsen, as did the economic circumstances. Meanwhile, the Japanese took a slightly softer stance and Council members began to criticize the administration. The question discussed at this session was how to rapidly implement modernization of people's lives. Again, there was a proposal for military training with real weapons, and Wuryaningrat called for the adoption of the slogan "freedom or death", anticipating an allied invasion of Java within the next 12 months.

==== Eighth Session (June 18–21, 1945) ====
On March 1, 1945, the establishment of the Investigating Committee for Preparatory Work for Independence (BPUPK) was announced by the Japanese to work on "preparations for independence in the region of the government of this island of Java". The opening ceremony was held in the Central Advisory Council building on May 28. The first BPUPK plenary session was help from May 28 to June 1 to discuss the form of a future Indonesian state. On the final day, Sukarno made a speech in which he outlined the philosophical basis for the nation, the five principles subsequently known as Pancasila.

Before the beginning of the final session of the Central Advisory Council, Vice-chairman M.A.A. Koesoemo Oetojo resigned because of his age. The members elected Hatta to replace him. In the session, delegates urged the Japanese administration to include more young people in the national leadership. Despite the fact the BPUPK had already discussed independence, the Council was still discussing total mobilisation of the people to assist the Japanese war effort. The question put by the military commander concerned how to implement the endeavor to motivate every person to direct their energies and undergo training to strengthen their defenses and purify efforts towards the preparation of Indonesian independence as soon as possible.

== Sumatra Central Advisory Council ==
Central Advisory Council (Sumatra)
- 中央参議院 (Chūō Sangiin), Dewan Pertimbangan Pusat

Agency overview
- Formed: 25 March 1945
- Dissolved: 2 July 1945
- Jurisdiction: 25th Army command
- Headquarters: Bukittinggi
- Employees: 40

The commander of the Japanese Twenty-Fifth Army, Gen. Moritake Tanabe, was much less enthusiastic about independence for Sumatra, the region under his authority, and was opposed to the idea of Sumatra being a part of any future Indonesian state. This view was Supported by his second in command, Lt. Gen Hamada Hiromu. Therefore, it was almost years after the establishment of the Java Central Advisory Council, when on March 25, 1945, before a similar body was announced for Sumatra, but it did not meet for the first time until the end of June. It had 40 members, 25 appointed by the Japanese and 15 chosen by the ten regional advisory councils. Mohammad Sjafei was appointed chairman. The vice-chairmen were Abdoel Abas and Teuku Nyak Arif. Like the Java body, this council also had a secretariat. This was headed by Sumatra journalist Djamaluddin Adinegoro.

=== Membership of Sumatra Central Advisory Council ===
The membership was as follows:

==== Appointed by the Japanese military administration of Sumatra ====
- A. Aziz (Tapanuli)
- A.R. Sutan Mansur (West Sumatra)
- Abdoel Katab (Jambi)
- Baringek (West Sumatra)
- Hamka (East Sumatra)
- Hsu Hua Chang (East Sumatra)
- Ibrahim (Palembang)
- Indra Tjahaja (Bangkulu)
- Makalam (Jambi)
- Mohd. Djamil (West Sumatra)
- Mohd. Hasbi (Aceh)
- Mohd. Jasin (Bangkulu)
- Mr. Abdul Abbas (Lampung)
- Oen Lam Seng (Bangka Belitung)
- Orang Kaja Mohd. Djamil (Mainland Riau)
- Othman (East Sumatra)
- R. Pirngadi (East Sumatra)
- Radja Kaliamsjah Sinaga (East Sumatra)
- Radja Saul Lumbantobing (Tapanuli)
- Rahim Pasaman (Lampung)
- Sjamsoeddin (Mainland Riau)
- T. Tjut Hasan (Aceh)
- T.P.P. Mohd. Ali (Aceh)
- Tjik Mat (Palembang)
- Tjik Wan (Palembang)

==== Elected by regional advisory councils ====
- Adnan Kapau Gani (Palembang)
- Abdoel Manan (Jambi)
- Abdoel Rozak (Palembang)
- Abdoellah (Bangkulu)
- Aminoedin (Mainland Riau)
- Chatib Suleiman (West Sumatra)
- Damrah (East Sumatra)
- Djamaluddin Adinegoro (East Sumatra)
- Ferdinand Lumbantobing (Tapanuli)
- Firman Rangkuti (Tapanuli)
- M. A. Sjarif (Bangka Belitung)
- Mohd. Baud Beureufehli (Aceh)
- Mohd. Sjafei (West Sumatra)
- Njak Arif (Aceh)
- Radja Pagar Alam (Lampung)

=== Sumatra Central Advisory Council Session (June 27–July 2, 1945) ===
The Sumatra Central Advisory Council met in Bukitinggi to discuss questions put to it by the Japanese military authorities. These concerned ways to strengthen the unity and resolve of the Sumatran people. It also passed a number of resolutions, including calling for the establishment of a Sumatran preparatory committee for independence and a 500,000-strong people's army. The Japanese subsequently announced a Sumatran Investigating Committee for Preparatory Work for Independence chaired by Mohammad Sjafei.

== See also ==
- Investigating Committee for Preparatory Work for Independence (BPUPK)
- Preparatory Committee for Indonesian Independence (PPKI)

== Works cited ==
- Anderson, Benedict (1961). Some Aspects of Indonesian Politics under the Japanese occupation, 1944-1945. Cornell University. Dept. Of Far Eastern Studies. Modern Indonesia Project. Interim reports series - Cornell University. Modern Indonesia Project. Ithaca, N.Y.: Cornell University.
- Arniati Prasedyawati Herkusumo (1982). Chuo Sangi-in: Dewan Pertimbang Pusat Pada Masa Pendudukan Jepang [Chuo Sangi-in: The Central Advisory Council during the Japanese Occupation] (in Indonesian). Jakarta, Indonesia: PT. Rosda Jayaputra.
- Daradjadi; Osa Kurniawan Ilham (2020). Pejambon 1945: Konsensus Agung para Pelatak Fondasi Bangsa [Pejambon 1845: The Great Consensus of the Nation's Founders] (in Indonesian). Jakarta: Kompas Gramedia. ISBN 978-623-00-2017-9.
- Elson, R.E. (2008). The Idea of Indonesia: A History. Cambridge University Press. ISBN 978-0-521-87648-3.
- Elson, R. E. (2009). "Another Look at the Jakarta Charter Controversy of 1945" (PDF). Indonesia. 88 (88): 105–130.
- Kahin, George McTurnan (1952). Nationalism and Revolution in Indonesia. Ithaca, New York: Cornell University Press.
- Kusuma, A.B. (2004). Lahirnya Undang-Undang Dasar 1945 : memuat salinan dokumen otentik badan oentoek menyelidiki oesaha2 persiapan kemerdekaan [The Birth of the 1945 Constitution: including copies of the authentic documents of the Investigating Committee for Preparatory Work for Independence] (in Indonesian). Depok, Indonesia: Badan Penerbit Fakultas Hukum Universitas Indonesia. ISBN 979-8972-28-7.
- Kusuma, A.B.; Elson, R.E. (2011). "A note on the sources for the 1945 constitutional debates in Indonesia" (PDF). Bijdragen tot de Taal-, Land- en Volkenkunde. 167 (2–3): 196–209. doi:10.1163/22134379-90003589. ISSN 0006-2294. Archived from the original (PDF) on 2022-09-25.
- Reid, Anthony (October 1971). "The Birth of the Republic of Sumatra" (PDF). Indonesia. 12 (12): 21–46. doi:10.2307/3350656. JSTOR 3350656.
- Ricklefs, M.C. (2008) [1981]. A History of Modern Indonesia Since c.1300 (4th ed.). London: MacMillan. ISBN 978-0-230-54685-1.
- Sato, Shigeru (1994). War, Nationalism and Peasants: Java under the Japanese Occupation 1942-1945. Allen & Unwin Pty Ltd. ISBN 1 86373 705 7.
