= Constitution of Indonesia =

Supreme law of Indonesia

1945 Constitution of the Unitary State of the Republic of Indonesia
- A 1946 print edition of the constitution, published by Indonesian National Committee Probolinggo branch

Overview
- Original title: Undang-Undang Dasar Negara Republik Indonesia Tahun 1945
- Jurisdiction: Unitary State of the Republic of Indonesia
- Created: 1 June–18 August 1945
- Presented: 18 August 1945
- Ratified: 18 August 1945
- Date effective: 18 August 1945
- System: Unitary Republic

Government structure
- Branches: 3
- Head of state: President
- Chambers: People's Consultative Assembly, consisting of House of Representatives and Regional Representative Council
- Executive: Cabinet led by the President
- Judiciary: Supreme Court, Constitutional Court, and Judicial Commission
- Federalism: Unitary
- Electoral college: No
- Entrenchments: 2

History
- First legislature: 29 August 1945
- First executive: 18 August 1945
- First court: 18 August 1945
- Amendments: 4
- Last amended: 11 August 2002
- Location: National Archives of Indonesia, Jakarta
- Commissioned by: Preparatory Committee for Indonesian Independence
- Author: Investigating Committee for Preparatory Work for Independence
- Media type: Printed text document
- Supersedes: Provisional Constitution of 1950
- Superseded by: Federal Constitution of 1949

Full text
- Constitution of the Republic of Indonesia at Wikisource

The 1945 Constitution of the Unitary State of the Republic of Indonesia (Indonesian: Undang-Undang Dasar Negara Kesatuan Republik Indonesia Tahun 1945, lit. 'Basic Law of the Unitary State of the Republic of Indonesia Year 1945', commonly abbreviated as UUD 1945 or UUD '45) is the supreme law and basis for all laws of Indonesia.

The constitution was written in June–August 1945, in the final months of the Japanese occupation of the Dutch East Indies at the end of World War II. It was abrogated by the Federal Constitution of 1949 and the Provisional Constitution of 1950, but restored by President Sukarno's 1959 Decree.

The 1945 Constitution sets forth the Pancasila, the five nationalist principles, as the embodiment of basic principles of an independent Indonesian state. It provides for a limited separation of executive, legislative, and judicial powers. The governmental system has been described as "presidential with parliamentary characteristics." Following major upheavals in 1998 and the resignation of President Suharto, several political reforms were set in motion, via amendments to the Constitution, which resulted in changes to all branches of government as well as additional human rights provisions.

== History ==
=== The writing ===
The Japanese invaded the Dutch East Indies in 1942, defeated the Dutch colonial regime, and occupied it for the duration of World War II. Soon after, the territory then fell under the jurisdiction of the Japanese Southern Expeditionary Army Group (南方軍, Nanpō gun), based in Saigon, Vietnam. The Japanese divided the territory into three military government regions, based on the largest islands: Sumatra was under the Japanese 25th Army, Java under the Japanese 16th Army and East Indonesia (the eastern islands), including part of Borneo (Sarawak and Sabah were under the Japanese 38th Army) was under the Imperial Japanese Navy. As the Japanese military position became increasingly untenable, especially after their defeat at the Battle of Leyte Gulf in October 1944, more and more native Indonesians were appointed to official positions in the occupation administration.

On 1 March 1945, the 16th Army established the Investigating Committee for Preparatory Work for Independence (Indonesian: Badan Penyelidik Usaha Persiapan Kemerdekaan (BPUPK)), for Java. The 25th Army later established a BPUPK for Sumatra. No such organisation existed for the remainder of the East Indies.

The BPUPK in Java, when established, consisted of 62 members, but there were 68 in the second session. It was chaired by Radjiman Wedyodiningrat (1879–1951). The future president Sukarno and vice-president Mohammad Hatta were among its members. It met in the building that had been used by the Dutch colonial quasi-parliament, the Volksraad ("People's Council") in central Jakarta. It held two sessions, 29 May – 1 June and 10–17 July 1945. The first session discussed general matters, including the philosophy of the state for future independent Indonesia, Pancasila, which future president Sukarno outlined in a speech on 1 June.

During the recess between the two BPUPK sessions, a Committee of Nine (Panitia Sembilan) comprising Sukarno, Hatta, Yamin, Maramis, Soebardjo, Wahid Hasjim, Muzakkir, Agus Salim and Abikoesno reformulated Sukarno's Pancasila in to a preamble for the future constitution. This later became known as the Jakarta Charter. This was something of a compromise, and included an obligation for Muslims to follow Sharia (Islamic law). In the second session, which opened on 10 July, a committee of 19 people produced a provisional constitution. They were:

- Sukarno
- A.A. Maramis
- Puruboyo
- Oto Iskandar di Nata
- Agus Salim
- Achmad Soebardjo
- Soepomo
- Maria Ulfah Santoso
- Wahid Hasyim
- Parada Harahap
- Johannes Latuharhary
- Susanto Tirtoprodjo
- Sartono
- Wongsonegoro
- Wuryaningrat
- Singgih
- Tan Eng Hoa
- Jayadiningrat
- Soekiman Wirjosandjojo

The draft constitution comprised 37 articles, 4 transitory provisions and 2 additional provisions. The nation would be a unitary state and a republic.

On 26 July 1945, the Allies called for the unconditional surrender of Japan in the Potsdam Declaration. The Japanese authorities, realising they would probably lose the war, began to make firm plans for Indonesian independence, more to spite the Dutch than anything else. On 6 August, an atomic bomb was dropped on Hiroshima. On 7 August, the Southern Expeditionary Army Group headquarters announced that an Indonesian leader could enact a body called the Preparatory Committee for Indonesian Independence (PPKI). The dropping of a second atomic bomb on Nagasaki, and the Soviet invasion of Manchuria on 9 August prompted the Japanese to surrender unconditionally on 15 August 1945. Sukarno and Hatta declared independence on 17 August 1945, and the PPKI met the following day.

In the meeting chaired by Sukarno, the 27 members, including Hatta, Soepomo, Wachid Hasjim, Sam Ratulangi and Subardjo, began to discuss the proposed constitution article by article. The Committee made some fundamental changes, including the removal of 7 words from the text of Jakarta Charter which stated the obligation for Muslims to follow Sharia. The new charter then became the preambule of the constitution, and the clause stating that the president must be a Muslim was removed. The historical compromise was made possible in part by the influence of Mohamad Hatta and Tengku Mohamad Hasan. The Committee then officially adopted the Constitution.

On 29 August, Sukarno dissolved the Preparatory Committee for Indonesian Independence and established the Central Indonesian National Committee (KNIP). Sukarno and Hatta appointed 135 members, including the membership of the PPKI to this new body. It included people representing areas outside Java, Islam, women and young people.

=== Other constitutions ===
Following the transfer of sovereignty to the United States of Indonesia (RIS), in December 1949, the state adopted a bicameral system. The KNIP met for the last time on 15 December 1949 to agree to the Republic of Indonesia joining the United States of Indonesia (RIS). However, this state was short lived and when Indonesia became a unitary state in August 1950, the Working Committee of the KNIP became part of the House of Representatives and Constitution 1945 (usually referred to by the Indonesian acronym "UUD'45") remained in force until it was replaced by the Federal Constitution on 27 December 1949. This was in turn replaced by the Provisional Constitution on 17 August 1950 which in the end turned back into the unitary state of the republic of Indonesia.

In 1955 elections were held for the House of Representatives (DPR) as well as for a Constitutional Assembly to draw up a definitive constitution. However, this became bogged down in disputes between nationalists and Islamists, primarily over the role of Islam in Indonesia. Sukarno became increasingly disillusioned by this stagnation and with the support of the military, who saw a much greater constitutional role for themselves, began to push for a return to the 1945 Constitution. This was put to the vote on 30 May 1958 and 2 June 1959, but the motion failed to gain the required two-thirds majority. Finally, on 5 July 1959 President Sukarno issued a decree dissolving the assembly and returning to the 1945 Constitution.

=== Constitutional amendments ===
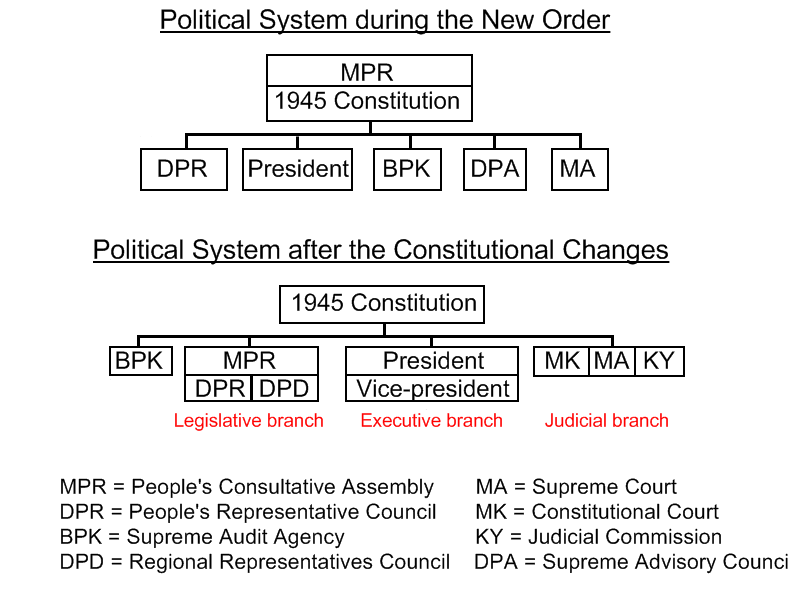
The Indonesian political system before and after the constitutional amendments

Suharto, who officially became president in 1968, refused to countenance any changes to the Constitution despite the fact that even Sukarno had viewed it as a provisional document. In 1983, the People's Consultative Assembly (MPR) passed a decree stipulating the need for a nationwide referendum to be held before any amendments were made to the Constitution. This led to a 1985 law requiring such a referendum to have a 90% turnout and for any changes to be approved by a 90% vote. Then in 1997, the activist Sri Bintang Pamungkas and two colleagues were arrested and jailed for publishing a proposed modified version of the 1945 Constitution.

With the fall of Suharto and the New Order regime in 1998, the 1983 decree and 1985 law were rescinded and the way was clear to amend the Constitution to make it more democratic. This was done in four stages at sessions of the MPR in 1999, 2000, 2001 and 2002. As a result, the original Constitution has grown from 37 articles to 73, of which only 11% remain unchanged from the original constitution.

The most important of the changes were:

- Limiting presidents to two terms of office
- Establishing a Regional Representative Council (DPD), which together with the DPR makes up an entirely elected MPR.
- Moving to a tripartite separation of powers system instead of a unified state power ultimately derived from the MPR.
- Purifying and empowering presidential system of government, instead of a parliamentary republic with an executive president.
- Stipulating democratic, direct elections for the president, instead of the president being elected by the MPR
- Reorganizing the mechanism of horizontal relation among state organs, instead of giving the highest constitutional position to the People's Assembly.
- Abolishing the Supreme Advisory Council
- Mandating direct, general, free, secret, honest, and fair elections for the House of Representatives and regional legislatures
- Establishing a Constitutional Court for guarding and defending the constitutional system as set forth in the constitution.
- Establishing a Judicial Commission
- The addition of ten entirely new articles concerning human rights.

Among the above changes, the establishment of Constitutional Court is regarded as a successful innovation in Indonesia constitutional system. The court was established in 2003 by 9 justices head by Professor Jimly Asshiddiqie, a prominent scholar from the University of Indonesia. There are five jurisdictions of the court, i.e. (i) constitutional review of law, (ii) disputes of constitutional jurisdiction between state institutions, (iii) disputes on electoral results, (iv) dissolution of political parties, and (v) impeachment of the president/vice-president. The other icon of success in Indonesian reform is the establishment of the Corruption Eradication Commission which independently fights against corruption and grafts. Corruption in Indonesia is regarded an extraordinary crime.

== Legal standing ==
The 1945 Constitution has the highest legal authority in the country's system of government. The executive, legislative and judicial branches of government must defer to it. The Constitution was originally officially enacted on 18 August 1945. The attached Elucidation, drawn up by Raden Soepomo (1903–1958), Indonesia's first justice minister, was officially declared to be a part of the Constitution on 5 July 1959. The Preamble, the body of the Constitution and the Elucidation were all reaffirmed as inseparable parts of the Constitution in 1959, and then again in Provisional MPR Decree No. XX/MPRS/1966. However, since the amendments, the Elucidation has not been updated, and still refers to the original document, including parts that have been removed, such as Chapter IV. During the sessions in the People's Assembly, all the ideas set forth in the Elucidation was transformed become articles in the new amendments. Lastly, final article of the amended Constitution states that the Constitution consists of the Preamble and the articles.

== Contents ==
=== Preamble ===
The preamble to the 1945 Constitution of Indonesia contains the Pancasila state philosophy.

THE PREAMBLE OF THE 1945 CONSTITUTION

Whereas Independence is the inalienable right of all nations; therefore, colonialism must be abolished in the world as it is not in conformity with humanity and justice.

And the moment of rejoicing has arrived in the struggle of the Indonesian independence movement to guide the people safely and well to the gate of the independence of the state of Indonesia which is independent, united, sovereign, just and prosperous;

By the blessings of Almighty God and motivated by the noble desire to live a free national life, the people of Indonesia hereby declare their independence.

Subsequent thereto, to form a government of the state of Indonesia which protect all the people of Indonesia and all the independence and the land that has been struggled for, and to improve public welfare, to educate the life of the nation and to participate toward the establishment of a world order based on freedom, perpetual peace and social justice, therefore the independence of Indonesia is formulated into a constitution of the Republic of Indonesia which is built into a sovereign state based on a belief in the One and Only God, just and civilized humanity, the unity of Indonesia, and democratic life led by wisdom of thoughts in deliberation amongst representatives of the people, and achieving social justice for all the people of Indonesia.

=== Chapter I: Form of state and sovereignty ===
States that Indonesia is a unitary republic based on law with sovereignty in the hands of the people and exercised through laws.

=== Chapter II: People's Consultative Assembly ===
States that the People's Consultative Assembly is made up of the members of the House of Representatives and the Regional Representatives Council, all of the members of both bodies being directly elected. The People's Consultative Assembly changes and passes laws, appoints the president, and can only dismiss the president or vice-president during their terms of office according to law.

=== Chapter III: Executive power ===
Outlines the powers of the president. States the requirements for the president and vice-president. Limits the president and vice-president to two terms of office and states that they be elected in a general election. Specifies the impeachment procedure. Includes the wording of the presidential and vice-presidential oath and promise of office.

=== Chapter IV: Supreme advisory council ===
The entire articles of this chapter has been removed by the fourth amendment of the Constitution. Previously, states the role of Supreme Advisory Council.

=== Chapter V: State ministries ===
Four short articles giving the cabinet a constitutional basis. The president appoints ministers.

=== Chapter VI: Local governments ===
Explains how Indonesia is divided into provinces, regencies and cities, each with its own administration chosen by general election. The leaders of these administrations are "chosen democratically". Autonomy is applied as widely as possible. The state recognises the special nature of certain regions.

=== Chapter VII: House of Representatives ===
Deputies of the House are to be elected by general election. It has the right to pass laws, and has legislative, budgeting and oversight functions. It has the right to request government statements and to put forward opinions.

=== Chapter VII-A: The Regional Representatives Council ===
An equal number of senators is chosen from each province via a general election. The Council can suggest bills related to regional issues to the House of Representatives. It also advises the House on matters concerning taxes, education and religion.

=== Chapter VII-B: General elections ===
General elections to elect the members of the House of Representatives, the Regional Representatives Council, the president and vice-president and the regional legislatures are free, secret, honest and fair and are held every five years. Candidates for the House of Representatives and regional legislatures represent political parties: those for the Regional Representatives Council are individuals.

=== Chapter VIII: Financial matters ===
States that the president puts forward the annual state budget for consideration by the House of Representatives.

=== Chapter VIII-A: Audit Board ===
Explains that this exists to oversee the management of state funds.

=== Chapter IX: Judicial powers ===
Affirms the independence of the judiciary. Explains the role and position of the Supreme Court as well as the role of the Judicial Commission. Also states the role of the Constitutional Court.

=== Chapter IX-A: State territory ===
States that the nation is an archipelago whose borders and rights are laid down by law.

=== Chapter X: Citizens and residents ===
Defines citizens and residents, and states that all citizens are equal before the law.

=== Chapter X-A: Human rights ===
Details the human rights guaranteed to all, including:

- the right of children to grow up free of violence and discrimination
- the right of all to legal certainty
- the right to religious freedom
- the right to choose education, work and citizenship as well as the right to choose where to live
- the right of assembly, association and expression of opinion
- the right to be free from torture

It also states that the rights not to be tortured, to have freedom of thought and conscience, of religion, to not be enslaved, to be recognised as an individual before the law and to not be charged under retroactive legislation cannot be revoked under any circumstances. Furthermore, every person has the right to freedom from discrimination on any grounds whatsoever.

Finally, every person is obliged to respect the rights of others.

=== Chapter XI: Religion ===
The nation is based on belief in one God, but the state guarantees religious freedom for all.

=== Chapter XII: State defence and security ===
States that all citizens have an obligation and right to participate in the defence of the nation. Outlines the structure and roles of the armed forces and the police.

=== Chapter XIII: Education and culture ===
States that every citizen has the right to an education. Also obliges the government to allocate 20 percent of the state budget to education.

=== Chapter XIV: National economy and social welfare ===
States that major means of production are to be controlled by the state. Also states that the state takes care of the poor.

=== Chapter XV: National flag, language, emblem, and anthem ===
Specifies the flag, official language, coat of arms, and national anthem of Indonesia.

=== Chapter XVI: Constitutional amendment ===
Lays down the procedures for proposing changes and amending the Constitution. Two-thirds of the members of the People's Consultative Assembly must be present: any proposed amendment requires a simple majority of the entire People's Consultative Assembly membership. The form of the unitary state cannot be changed.

=== Transitional provisions ===
States that laws and bodies continue to exist until new ones are specified in this constitution. Calls for the establishment of a Constitutional court before 17 August 2003.

=== Additional provisions ===
Tasks the People's Consultative Assembly with re-examining decrees it passes and its predecessors for their validity to be determined in the 2003 general session.

== See also ==
- Constitutional economics
- Constitutionalism
