= Oto Iskandar di Nata =

Indonesian politician and national hero (1897–1945)

Raden Oto Iskandar di Nata
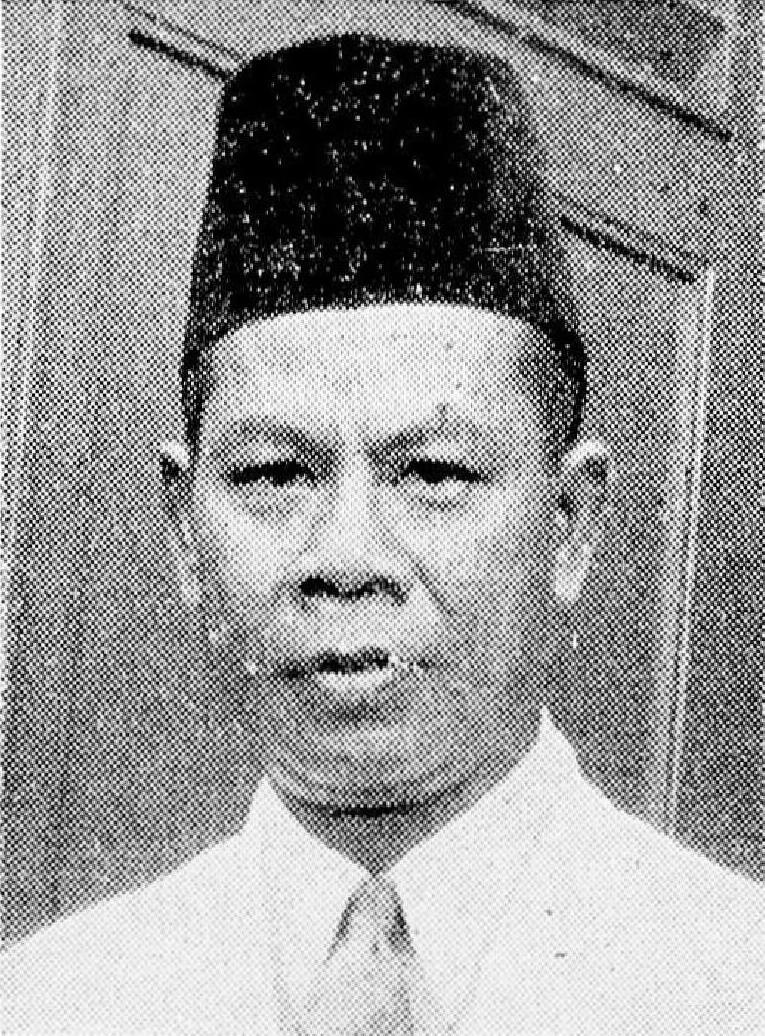
- Portrait, c. 1942–1943

State Minister of Indonesia
- In office 19 August 1945 – 14 November 1945
- President: Sukarno

Personal details
- Born: 31 March 1897 Bodjongsoang, Bandoeng, Dutch East Indies
- Disappeared: 19 December 1945 (aged 48); Tangerang, West Java, Indonesia
- Status: Retrospectively declared dead in absentia on 20 December 1945 (aged 48) on 6 November 1973

Oto Iskandar di Nata (Sundanese: ᮛ᮪ᮓ᮪. ᮇᮒ᮪ᮒᮧ ᮄᮞ᮪ᮊᮔ᮪ᮓᮁᮓᮤᮔᮒ, also spelled Otto Iskandardinata, called Otista and nicknamed Si Jalak Harupat; born 31 March 1897 – disappeared 19 December 1945, retrospectively declared dead 20 December 1945) was an Indonesian politician and National Hero.

== Work ==
In his activities during the period before independence, Oto served as Deputy Chairperson of the Bandung branch of Budi Utomo between 1921 and 1924, as well as Deputy Chairperson at the Pekalongan branch of Budi Utomo in 1924. At that time, he became a member of Pekalongan's Gemeenteraad (City Council) representing Budi Utomo.

Oto was also active in the Sundanese cultural organization Paguyuban Pasundan. He became Secretary of the Executive Board in 1928 and became chairman between 1929 and 1942. The organization engaged in education, socio-cultural, political, economic, youth and women's empowerment.

Oto also became a member of the Volksraad (People's Council), equivalent to the present-day national DPR, between 1930 and 1941.

During the Japanese occupation of the Dutch East Indies, he became the head of the Tjahaja newspaper. He was also appointed to the Javanese Central Advisory Council, set up the occupation government, and later became a member of the Investigating Committee for Preparatory Work for Independence (BPUPK) and the Preparatory Committee for Indonesian Independence (PPKI) formed by the Japanese Sixteenth Army to help prepare for Java's independence.

== Disappearance ==
Based on witness information, Oto is believed to have been murdered on a beach in Mauk District, Tangerang Regency in Banten (formerly West Java). He was abducted by a group called Laskar Hitam (Black Warriors), who killed him and dumped his body into the sea; the body was never found. In 1959 a policeman was charged and convicted of the murder. The prosecutor who located the policeman asked to investigate further to determine the larger political objectives and members of Laskar Hitam, but this request was not heeded, so the true circumstances of his murder remain unclear.

== Aftermath and legacy ==
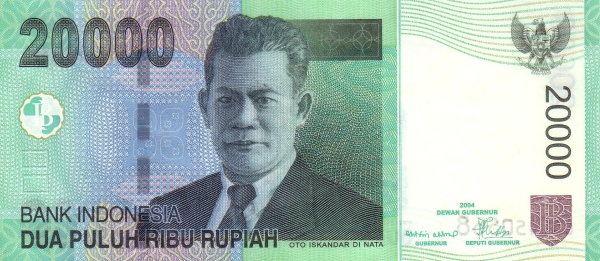
Oto is featured on the 20,000-rupiah banknote issued in 2004.

On 21 December 1952, his funeral was held in absentia. His body was replaced by sand and water taken from the beach and interred in a cemetery in Lembang, now of West Bandung Regency. He was designated as a National Hero of Indonesia on 6 November 1973, thus legally declaring him dead, as the title is awarded posthumously.

His image appears on the 2004–2016 series of the 20,000 Indonesian rupiah note. His name is now used as a street name in various cities in Indonesia in different formats; Otto Iskandardinata, Otto Iskandar Dinata, Otista, and Jalak Harupat, after a mythical rooster. It is used as a name for Jalak Harupat Stadium, located in his hometown.

He had twelve children. One, Ratnati Soertiasih (1939–1998), was briefly an exchange student in the United States.

== See also ==
- List of kidnappings
- List of people who disappeared mysteriously: 1910–1990
- List of unsolved murders (1900–1979)
