= Pancasila Building =

Historic building in Jakarta, Indonesia

- Gedung Pancasila
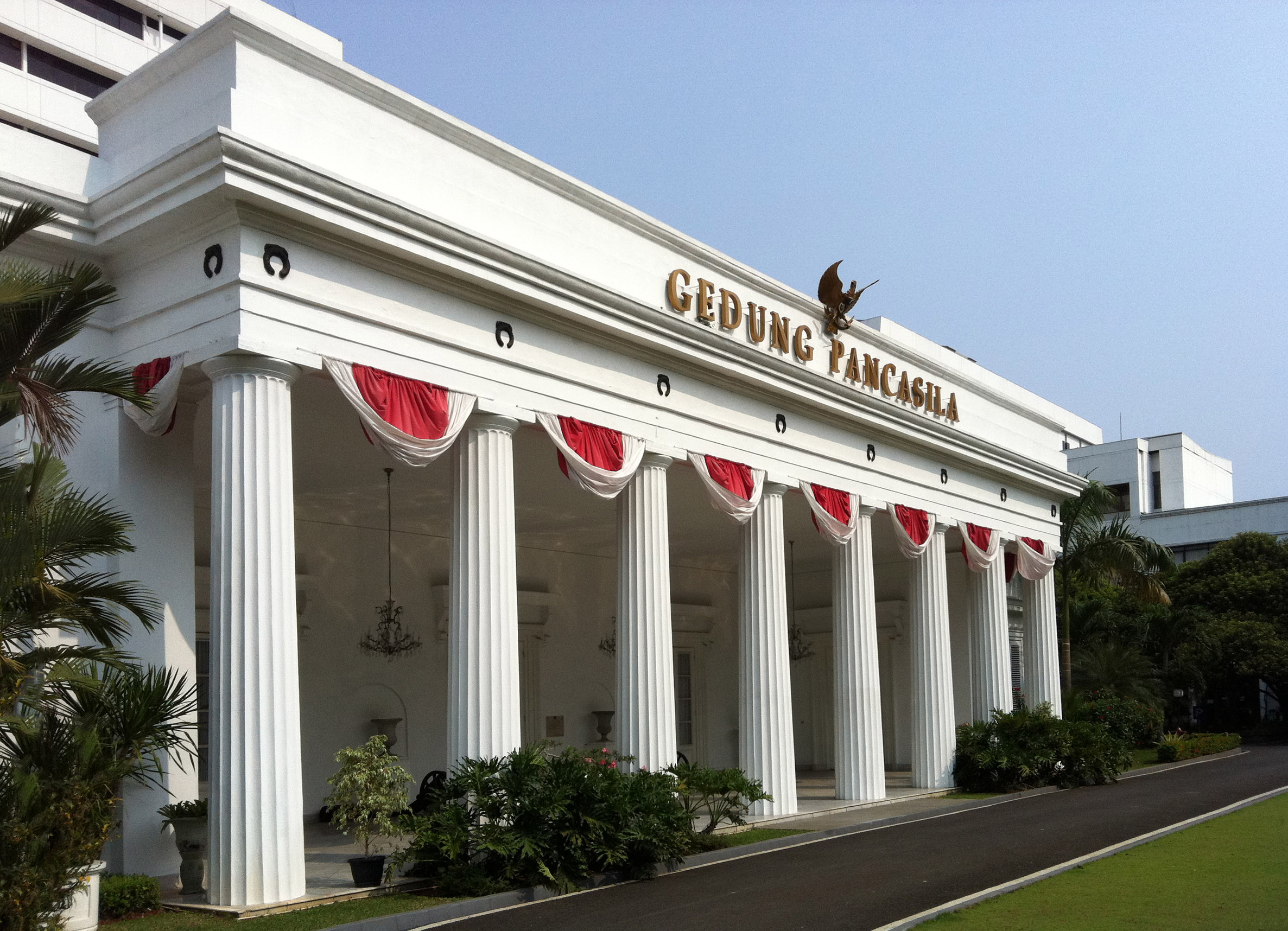
- The front facade of the Pancasila Building

- Location within Jakarta
- Former names: Residence of Hertog Bernhard; Volksraadgebouw

General information
- Status: Used as museum
- Type: Government building
- Architectural style: Indies Empire style
- Location: Jakarta, Indonesia, Jl. Pejambon No. 6, Jakarta 10410
- Coordinates: 6°10′28″S 106°50′1″E
- Construction started: early 1830s

Design and construction
- Architect: J. Tromp

The Pancasila Building (Indonesian: Gedung Pancasila) is a historic building located in Central Jakarta, Indonesia. The name "Pancasila" refers to the speech delivered by Sukarno in the building on which he spoke about the concept of Pancasila, a philosophical concept which would be the foundation of the Indonesian nation, on 1 June 1945. Built in the early 1830s by the Dutch, the building is one of the many 19th-century colonial landmarks in Jakarta. The Pancasila Building currently belongs to and is under the preservation of the Indonesian Ministry of Foreign Affairs.

== History ==
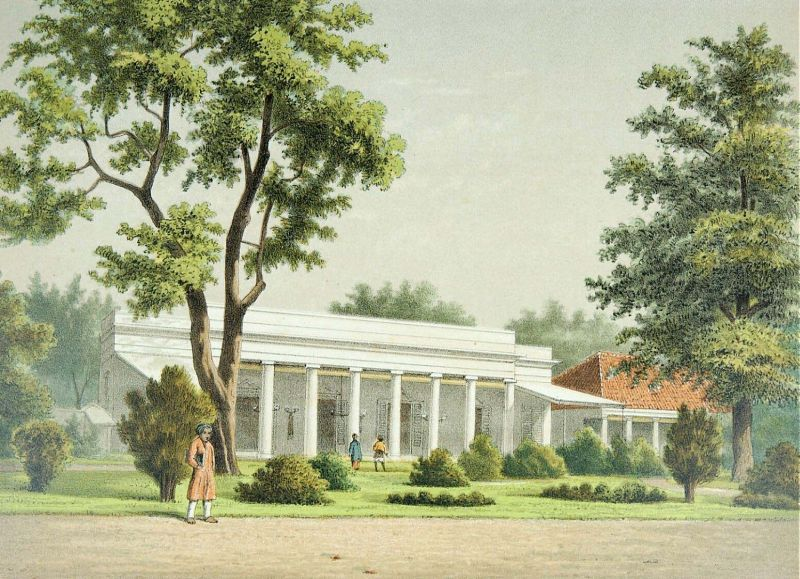
The building as the residence of the Dutch Royal Army Commander.

The building was built in the Weltevreden neighborhood, a parcel of land acquired by Cornelis Chastelein on 6 March 1697 on the east side of the bovenstad (the Upper Town) in what is now the area to the east of Merdeka Square. It was built in 1830 as a residence for Prince (Hertog) Bernhard van Saxe-Weimar-Eisenach (1792-1862), the German-born commander of the Dutch colonial army. It was designed in a Neoclassical Empire Style on the east bank of the Ciliwung. The street was originally named Hertogsweg in honor of the prince.

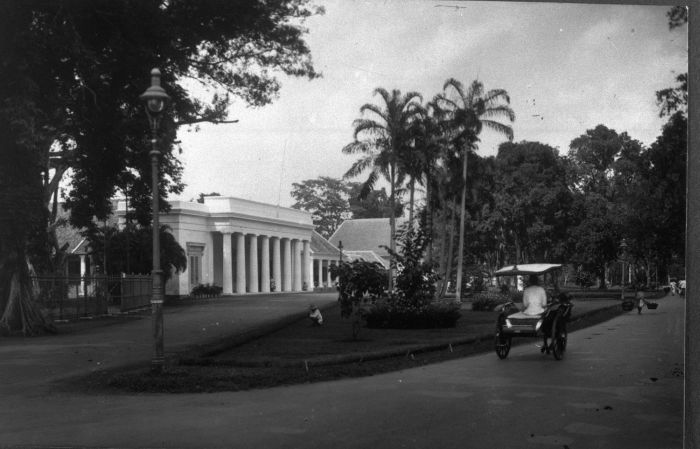
The building as the Volksraadgebouw in the early 20th-century.

The building was used by successive army commanders until the headquarters was moved to Bandung some time between 1914 and 1917. In 1918, the building housed the Volksraad of the Dutch East Indies, the first national-level council which included native Indonesian representation. It received the name Volksraadgebouw (Building of the Volksraad). The building was particularly suitable because of the large hall, which extended the entire width.

With the dissolution of the Volksraad during the Japanese occupation, from 1943, the building was re-purposed for the Central Advisory Council, an advisory body set up by the Japanese, and in 1945 was used by the Investigating Committee for Preparatory Work for Independence (BPUPK). On 1 June 1945, future Indonesian president Sukarno gave a speech before the BPUPK in which he outlined the philosophy of the Indonesian state, the Pancasila

After Indonesian independence, in the early 1950, the building was transferred to the State Department, and then in 1956 to the Ministry of Foreign Affairs. It was renamed Gedung Pancasila or the Pancasila Building on 1 June 1964. During the 1960s, the building was used to educate prospective diplomats. Today, the building is mainly used for important ceremonies of the Ministry of Foreign Affairs.

== Cited works ==
- Daradjadi; Osa Kurniawan Ilham (2020). Pejambon 1945: Konsensus Agung para Pelatak Fondasi Bangsa [Pejambon 1845: The Great Consensus of the Nation's Founders] (in Indonesian). Jakarta: Kompas Gramedia. ISBN 978-623-00-2017-9.
- Kaart van Batavia, tusschen de Groote Zuyderweg en langs de Mokervaart [Map of Batavia, Between the Great southern road and along the Mokervaart] (Map) (in Dutch). Cartography by Anonymous. Kaartcollectie Buitenland Leupe. 1700s.
- Heuken, Adolf (2000). Historical Sites of Jakarta (6th ed.). Jakarta, Indonesia: Cipta Loka Caraka.
- Kahin, George McTurnan (1952). Nationalism and Revolution in Indonesia. Ithaca, New York: Cornell University Press.
- Merrillees, Scott (2015). Jakarta: Portraits of a Capital 1950-1980. Jakarta: Equinox Publishing. ISBN 9786028397308.

== See also ==
- Batavia, Dutch East Indies
- List of colonial buildings and structures in Jakarta
