= Sosrodiningrat V =

Indonesian nobleman

- Kanjeng Raden Mas Adipati Sasradiningrat V

Pepatih Dalem of Surakarta
- Reign: 1939–1945
- Predecessor: Kanjeng Pangeran Arya Adipati Joyonagoro
- Born: Raden Mas Sawarno; 1 December 1902
- Died: 8 February 1967 (aged 64); Mangkubumen Hospital, Surakarta
- Burial: Imogiri Royal Cemetery, Bantul Regency
- Spouse: Bendara Raden Ajeng Kusngaisah/Bendara Raden Ayu Adipati Sasradiningrat
- Father: Kanjeng Pangeran Arya Adipati Joyonagoro
- Mother: Raden Kudanawarsa

Sosrodiningrat V (1 December 1902 – 8 February 1967), formally Drs. K.R.M.A. Sosrodiningrat, was a nobleman within the Surakarta Sunanate, serving as its pepatih dalem between 1939 and 1945. He was also a member of the Investigating Committee for Preparatory Work for Independence, and served in various posts within the colonial government of the Dutch East Indies throughout the 1920s and 1930s.

== Early life and education ==
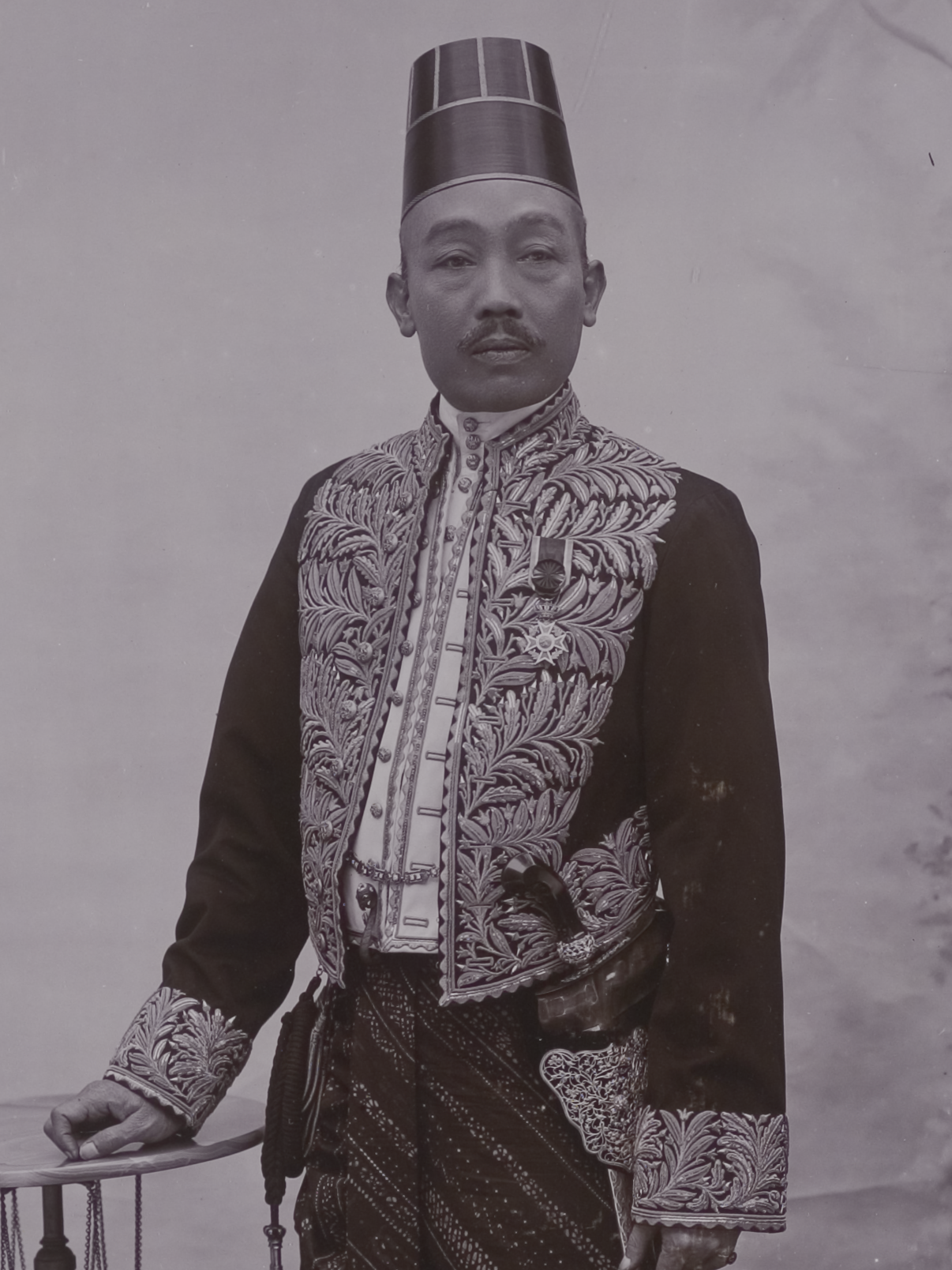
Sosrodiningrat IV, father of Joyonagoro and grandfather of Sosrodiningrat V.

Sosrodiningrat was born Sawarno on 1 December 1902 in Surakarta. His father, Joyonagoro, was patih under Surakarta's Sunanate. Sawarno was educated at an Europeesche Lagere School in Surakarta, before continuing to a Hogere Burgerschool in Semarang and graduating in 1913. Afterwards, Sawarno studied in the Netherlands, at the Delft Institute of Technology. However, his engineering studies were interrupted by the First World War, and after it ended in 1918 Sawarno moved to Leiden University to study public administration. Graduating with his bachelors in 1921, he returned to the Indies in 1922.

== Career ==
After returning, he became a civil servant within the colonial government, first in Boyolali before being relocated to Wonogiri in 1925. In 1926, he was assigned to Surakarta's Land Office. His five-year contract with the colonial government expired in 1927, and he began to work within the Sunanate. He was appointed as under-regent and received the title Raden Mas Tumenggung Sosrowadono. His other assignments included being an agricultural attache in Purwodadi, working in Semarang's municipal police, and becoming an aide to the regent of Surakarta. He returned to Leiden in 1932, receiving his doctorate in 1935 and returning to Surakarta to become head of the Sunanate's revenue office. He was given a regent title in 1936, and following his father's death in 1939 he became the Sunanate's pepatih dalem as Kanjeng Mas Raden Adipati Sosrodiningrat V.

During the Japanese occupation, Sosrodiningrat was first appointed as a member of the Central Advisory Council (Chūō San'gi In), before becoming a member of the Investigating Committee for Preparatory Work for Independence. On 17 October 1945, during the chaos in the early days of the Indonesian National Revolution, he was kidnapped by anti-feudal groups and held in East Java. Surakarta had previously proposed that the region be integrated within the nascent Republic as an autonomous region, but unlike nearby Yogyakarta, the region could not maintain order and the Sunanate was later dissolved. Sosrodiningrat was released in January 1946.

Following his release, Sosrodiningrat was appointed by the Indonesian government to head the newly formed Bank Negara Indonesia's Surakarta branch, and he worked in the bank until 1950. In 1951, he became an adviser to the Sultan Hamengkubuwono IX of Yogyakarta, and in 1956 he also became an adviser for the Ministry of Home Affairs. He also consulted the presidential office on state protocols and lectured in various universities and academies in Surakarta. He was head of the faculty of economics at the Islamic University of Indonesia and head of the faculty of education at the Muhammadiyah University of Surakarta. He died on 8 February 1967, and was buried at the Imogiri Cemetery Complex in Yogyakarta.

== Ancestry ==
Ancestors of Sosrodiningrat V

Kanjeng Raden Adipati Sasranagara
Kanjeng Raden Adipati Sasradiningrat IV
Raden Ayu Adipati Sasranagara
Kanjeng Pangeran Arya Adipati Jayanagara
Raden Sumarsih
Sasradiningrat V
Raden Kudanawarsa
