= Tan Eng Hoa =

Indonesian independence activist (1907–1949)

- Born: February 24, 1907; Semarang, Dutch East Indies
- Died: August 14, 1949 (aged 42); Jakarta, Dutch East Indies

Tan Eng Hoa (陳英華) (February 24, 1907 – April 14, 1949) was born in Semarang and studied in the HBS. He graduated in law from the Rechts Hogeschool in Batavia in 1932. In 1945, he represented the Chinese Indonesians community in the Japanese-sponsored Investigating Committee for Preparatory Work for Independence, where he proposed an article for the freedom of association in the drafting of the Constitution of Indonesia. He died in April 1949 due to pancreatic cancer.

== Early life ==
Tan was born in Semarang in 1907, to parents who owned a grocery store.
