= Tony Wen =

Indonesian footballer and politician (1911–1963)

- 温敬多; Boen Kin To

Member of the Provisional House of Representatives
- In office 18 Agustus 1954 – 26 Maret 1956
- President: Sukarno
- Preceded by: Yap Tjwan Bing
- Succeeded by: Tjung Tin Jan; Tan Kiem Liong; Oei Tjeng Hien; Tan Eng Hong
- Constituency: Chinese Minority section

Member of the Konstituante
- In office 9 November 1956 – 5 July 1959
- President: Sukarno
- Constituency: West Kalimantan

Personal details
- Born: Boen Kin To; 26 April 1911 Sungailiat, Bangka Island, Dutch East Indies
- Died: 30 May 1963 (Age 52) Jakarta, Indonesia
- Party: PNI
- Occupation: Politician, Businessman

Tony Wen (26 April 1911 – 30 May 1963), born Boen Kin To, was an Indonesian historical figure, former football manager, and footballer.

== Early life ==
Tony Wen, also known as Boen Kin To, was born in Sungailiat, Bangka, Dutch East Indies in 1911 to a well-to-do family. His father was a ditch chief at the Bangka Biliton Tin Maatschappij.

Upon finishing high school, he continued his studies in Singapore, then U Ciang University in Shanghai, and then Liang Nam University in Canton. After returning to Jakarta (Batavia), he became a physical education teacher at Pa Hoa School (T.H.H.K.). He was also a highly skilled, agile, and energetic national football player. Before World War II broke out, he was a renowned player for the UMS (Union Makes Strength) team.

== Career ==
Wen is regarded as an important historical figure in Indonesia for his role in helping Indonesia financially shortly after independence.

During the Indonesian National Revolution, Tony Wen was known as the leader of the Chinese Rebel Front (BPTH) (Barisan Pemberontak Tionghoa) in Solo. Furthermore, as acknowledged by former Vice President Adam Malik in "Serving the Republic Volume 2" (1978:5), Tony was also a center forward for the then-famous PSIS (Solo) team. Furthermore, as a trader, Tony Wen also provided logistics for the Indonesian army, which was in disarray at the time.

Following Indonesia's Independence, In the 1950s, he was appointed as a member of the Indonesian Olympic Committee and a member of the Football Association of Indonesia (PSSI). In 1952, he became a member of the Indonesian National Party (PNI). From August 1954 to March 1956, he was appointed a member of the House of Representatives (constituent assembly) representing the PNI for the South Sumatra electoral district. He served in the Interim Democratic Cabinet and in 1955 was in the Ali Sastroamidjojo Cabinet. Tony also continued to be involved in sports. He was also active in the basketball branch. Tony became one of the founders of the Indonesian Basketball Association (Perbasi) on 23 October 1951 and was the first chairman of Perbasi.

== Death ==
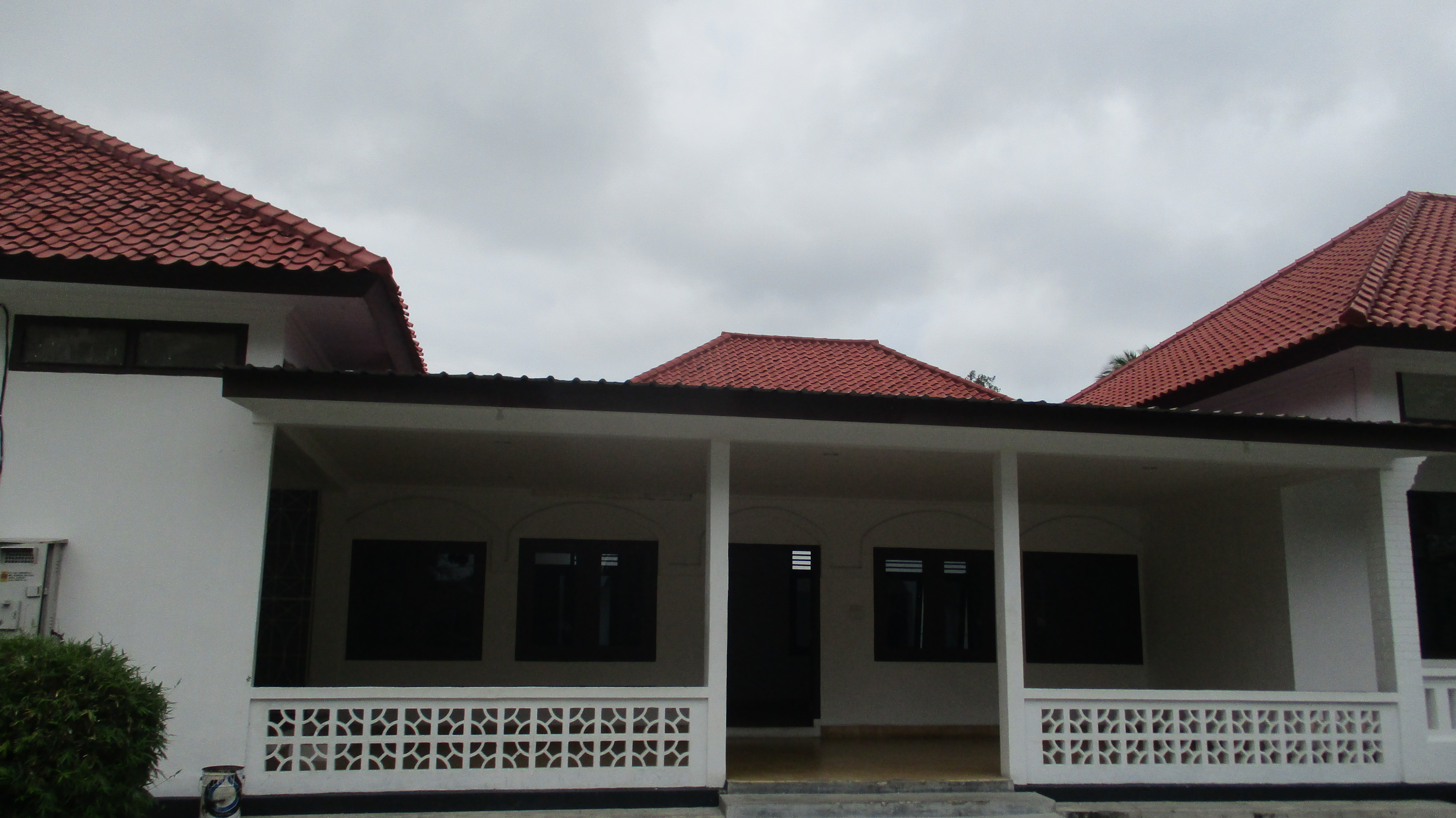
Tony Wen's House in Sungailiat, Bangka.

Wen died on 30 May 1963, and was buried in Menteng, Central Jakarta.
