= Pancasila =

Indonesian political philosophy

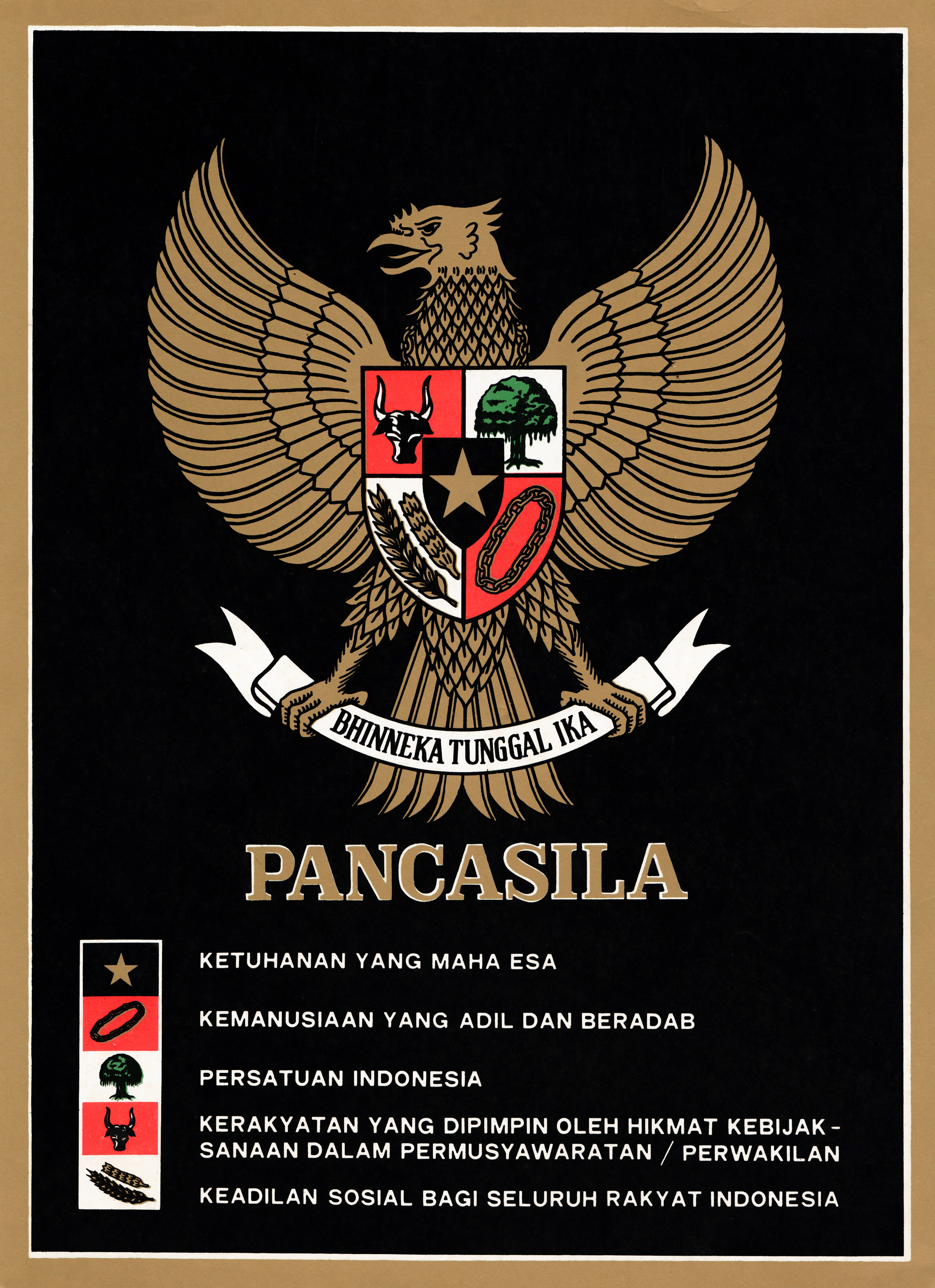
A depiction of the Garuda Pancasila on a poster; each tenet of the Pancasila is written beside its symbol.

Pancasila (Indonesian: [pantʃaˈsila]) is the official, foundational philosophical theory and state ideology of Indonesia. The name is made from two words originally derived from Sanskrit: pañca 'five' and śīla 'principles; precepts'.

It is composed of five principles:

1. Ketuhanan yang Maha Esa (Belief in the One and Only God) (Note: While the official BPIP translation is rendered as "Belief in the One and Only God", a direct morphological translation yields "Godhood that is One and Only" or "Divinity that is the Great One". It serves as an explicit acknowledgement of Dzat Yang Maha Kuasa ('almighty being', or divine providence) meant as a principle for a society with a diversity of religions and beliefs.)
2. Kemanusiaan yang adil dan beradab (Just and Civilized Humanity) (Note: A more direct, literal rendering of the original Indonesian syntax yields "Humanity that is just and civilized".)
3. Persatuan Indonesia (The Unity of Indonesia)
4. Kerakyatan yang dipimpin oleh hikmat kebijaksanaan dalam permusyawaratan/perwakilan (Democratic Life Led by Wisdom of Thoughts in Deliberations Amongst Representatives of the People) (Note: A direct, literal rendering of the original Indonesian syntax is "Democracy that is led by profound wisdom in deliberation/representation".)
5. Keadilan sosial bagi seluruh rakyat Indonesia (Social Justice for All the People of Indonesia)

The legal formulation of Pancasila is enshrined within the fourth paragraph of the preamble of the Constitution of Indonesia.

== Background ==
In 1942, the Empire of Japan invaded and occupied the Dutch East Indies. Following setbacks in the Pacific War, the Japanese promised future self-government for Indonesia and, in September 1943, established the Central Advisory Council (CAC) in Java, chaired by pre-war independence activist Sukarno. On 15 November 1944, at the fourth session of the CAC, Sukarno gave a speech listing five guidelines for life for the Indonesian nation. These guidelines were produced by a committee headed by Sukarno and were dubbed the "Five Obligations" (Panca Dharma). They stipulated that:

1. We, together with other nations in Greater East Asia, are lifelong allies of Japan;
2. We will establish a nation of Free Indonesia, with full respect for the service and assistance from Japan, and will remain a member of the Co-Prosperity Sphere;
3. We will endeavor to advance high morality and our culture;
4. We will give eternal service to the nation and people with all our strength and with devotion to Allah;
5. Based on the Japanese principle (Hakkō ichiu), we will strive to build eternal peace.

On 1 March 1945, the Japanese 16th Army, which was responsible for Java during the Japanese occupation of the Dutch East Indies, announced the establishment of the Investigating Committee for Preparatory Work for Independence (BPUPK) to work on "preparations for independence in the region of the government of this island of Java." The first session of the BPUPK opened on 28 May 1945, and discussions regarding the basis for a future independent Indonesia began the following day. Various speakers put forward proposals, with Wiranatakusumah suggesting the adoption of the Panca Dharma.

== Formulation ==
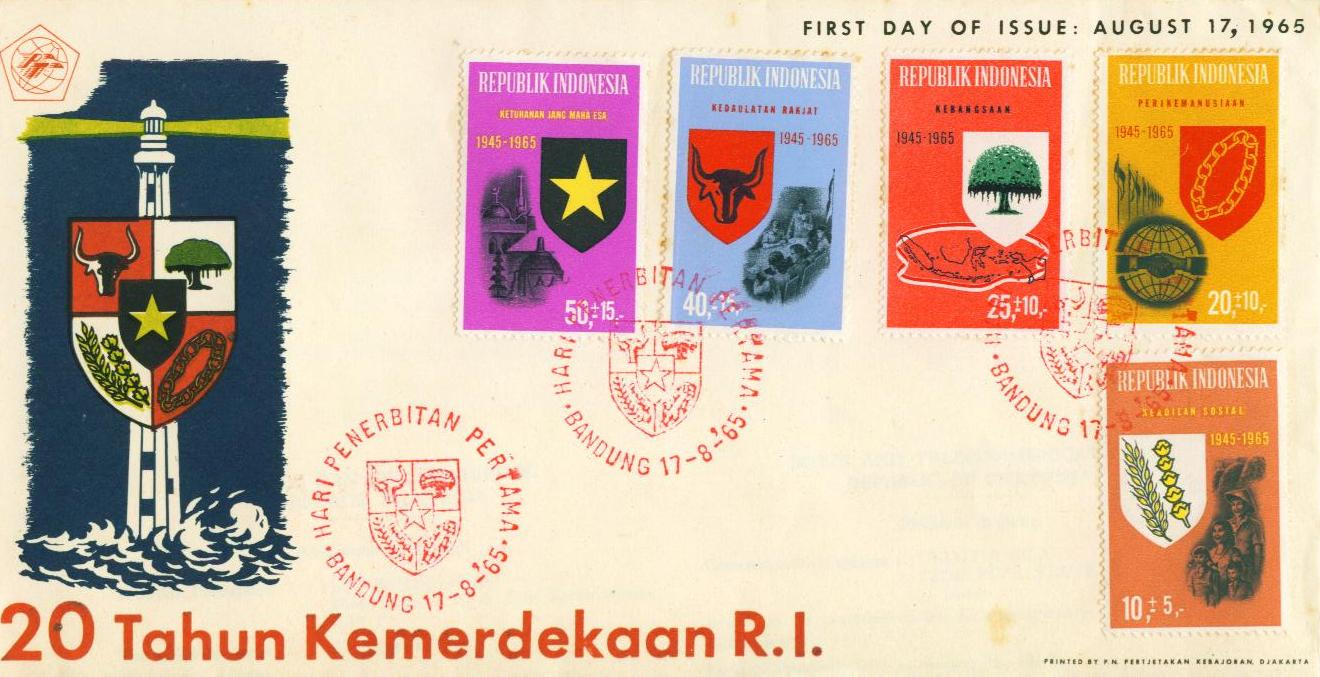
Five Pancasila symbols on Indonesian stamps (1965)

On 1 June 1945, the final day of the first BPUPK session, Indonesian nationalist Sukarno made a speech, later known as the "Birth of Pancasila Address", in which he proposed five principles to form the philosophical basis of an independent Indonesia. His original formulation was:

1. Kebangsaan Indonesia: Indonesian patriotism and the inclusion of all people living in Indonesia;
2. Internasionalisme: Internationalism, emphasizing justice and the virtue of humanity;
3. Musyawarah Mufakat: Deliberative consensus, emphasizing a form of representative democracy where ethnic dominance is absent and each council member possesses equal voting power;
4. Kesejahteraan Sosial: Social Welfare, premised on the theory of the welfare state and popular socialism;
5. Ketuhanan yang Berkebudayaan: A Divinity that upholds religious freedom (a formulation allowing both monotheism and polytheism to accommodate all of Indonesia's major religions).

In his speech, Sukarno rejected the name Panca Dharma, noting that "dharma" means 'obligation', whereas he was proposing principles. He stated his preference for the symbolic meaning of the number five, drawing parallels to the Five Pillars of Islam, the five fingers on a hand, and the five senses. He officially named these principles Pancasila. This formulation represented a compromise between advocates for an Islamic state and those for a secular state. Sukarno also proposed that the five principles could be compressed into three (trisila): socio-nationalism, socio-democracy, and belief in God. These three could be further compressed into a single principle (ekasila): gotong royong (mutual cooperation).

Garuda Pancasila, the national emblem of Indonesia

During the recess between the two BPUPK sessions, the Committee of Nine (Panitia Sembilan)—composed of Sukarno, Mohammad Hatta, Mohammad Yamin, Alexander Andries Maramis, Achmad Soebardjo, Ki Hadikusumo, Wahid Hasyim, Agus Salim, and Abikusno—drafted a preamble for the constitution incorporating Sukarno's philosophy. This draft became known as the Jakarta Charter. The committee rearranged the order of Sukarno's principles: the fifth sila regarding divinity was moved to the first position; the second sila remained in place; the original first sila became the third; and the original third and fourth principles were renumbered as the fourth and fifth, respectively.

Sukarno accepted this revised structure. The first sila of the Jakarta Charter was originally formulated as "Ketuhanan dengan kewajiban menjalankan syariat Islam bagi pemeluk-pemeluknya" ("Belief in God, with the obligation for its Muslim adherents to carry out Islamic law"). However, on 18 August 1945 the Preparatory Committee for Indonesian Independence (PPKI) deleted the clause "dengan kewajiban menjalankan syariat Islam bagi pemeluk-pemeluknya", leaving the first sila simply as "Ketuhanan Yang Maha Esa" to ensure national unity.

Pembukaan Undang-Undang Dasar adalah pokok dari pokok, sebab itu harus teruntuk bagi seluruh bangsa Indonesia dengan tiada kecualinya. Kalau sebagian daripada dasar itu hanya mengikat sebagian rakyat Indonesia, sekalipun terbesar, itu dirasakan oleh golongan-golongan minoritas sebagai diskriminasi.

[The preamble of the Constitution is the core of the core, therefore it must be intended for the entire Indonesian nation without exception. If only a part of that foundation binds only a portion of the Indonesian people, even if the largest, it would be felt by minority groups as discrimination.]

— Mohammad Hatta, Memoir

== Rationale ==
By the first half of the 20th century, several ideologies had been established or made their way to the Dutch East Indies, including imperialism and its antithesis anti-colonial nationalism, traditional Javanese statecraft, Islamism, democracy, socialism, and communism. Proponents of these ideologies formed political organizations and parties to forward their respective causes. The Islamist party Sarekat Islam was established in 1905, followed by Masyumi in 1943. The Communist Party was established in 1914, while Sukarno's nationalist Indonesian National Party was established in 1927. During the struggle for independence, a debate emerged over whether the foundation of the future state should be "Islamic" or "secular" in nature. Pancasila was proposed as a compromise that would best serve the unity and diversity of Indonesia. It was envisioned as an ideal form of civic nationalism—an effort to replace a political culture based on primordial or religious loyalties with a new sense of "inclusive nationalism," where the existence and differences of various groups were recognized without discrimination.

In a speech to the 15th United Nations General Assembly on 30 September 1960, Sukarno affirmed that the first sila of Pancasila did not aim to persecute atheists or those without a religion. He argued that because atheists in Indonesia possessed a characteristic national tolerance, they could accept the principle of "Belief in the One and Only God" as a broad cultural characteristic of the nation.

Pancasila was influenced by aspects of several world values and ideologies, including nationalism, humanitarianism, individual rights, freedom of religion, democracy, and socialism. The urgent need to unify a highly diverse archipelago also led to the adoption of the national motto, Bhinneka Tunggal Ika (often translated as unity in diversity). It declares that despite immense ethnic and cultural differences, the Indonesian people are one. Ultimately, Pancasila functions as a syncretic bridge, integrating these competing ideological threads into a distinct, comprehensive state philosophy. Hence, as Pancasila is a collective work produced through mutual consensus, it serves as a common denominator that unites Indonesian identity.

== Post-independence development ==
=== Sukarno ===
During the Parliamentary era (1949–1955), liberal democracy was adopted as the basic philosophy, with political parties playing key roles in government. However, the original 1945 concept of a strong "family state" faced criticism, particularly from the Dutch, who accused Sukarno and Hatta of being Japanese collaborators. Critics decried the family state model as inherently authoritarian, citing its emphasis on strong executive power and the suppression of individual rights. The parliamentary period proved highly unstable, ending in gridlock as parties clashed over ideological, regional, and ethnic interests, leading to frequent cabinet collapses. Discontented with partisan politics, the increasingly powerful military began to cooperate with Sukarno, introducing new political formats framed as a revival of the "Spirit of 1945" and the implementation of the family state concept.

In the campaign for the 1955 Indonesian legislative election, nationalist and left-wing parties such as the Indonesian National Party (PNI) and the Communist Party of Indonesia (PKI) championed Pancasila to distinguish themselves from the Islamic Masyumi Party. They feared that a Masyumi electoral victory would result in Islam replacing Pancasila as the ideological basis of the nation. In the Constitutional Assembly of Indonesia, elected in 1955 to draft a permanent constitution to replace the Provisional Constitution of 1950, the parties fractured along ideological lines. The Pancasila Bloc held 53.3% of the seats, while the Islamic Bloc held 44.8%. Because of these absolutist stances, the debate over the state philosophy could not be resolved. On 5 July 1959, President Sukarno dissolved the assembly by decree and unilaterally reimposed the 1945 Constitution. Because this document contained the original Pancasila formulation, the Pancasila versus Islam constitutional debate was abruptly ended. Sukarno argued that the Indonesian revolution required harmony and mutual cooperation among all groups, ideals he claimed were fully represented by Pancasila. This marked the introduction of Guided Democracy.

=== Suharto ===
Following the collapse of Sukarno's government in the aftermath of the 30 September Movement (the next day, 1 October, is commemorated as Hari Kesaktian Pancasila, literally Pancasila Sanctity Day), Suharto's New Order emerged. Suharto dissolved the PKI and purged the parliament of communists and Sukarno loyalists. The New Order was characterized by military dominance in government, extreme centralization, the weakening of democratic institutions and a free press, and a bureaucratic authoritarian regime. While denouncing Sukarno’s failed implementation of the Pancasila state, Suharto claimed his administration would properly legalize and implement its principles. As part of a broader policy of de-Sukarnoization, the New Order downplayed Sukarno's role in formulating the ideology and recast Pancasila, presenting its own rule as the restoration of a "pure and consistent" (murni dan konsekwen) application of Pancasila.

Pancasila democracy endeavors to strike a balance between the interests of the individual and those of society. It seeks to prevent the oppression of the weak by the strong, whether by economic or political means. Therefore, we hold that Pancasila is a socio-religious society. Briefly its major characteristics are its rejection of poverty, backwardness, conflicts, exploitation, capitalism, feudalism, dictatorship, colonialism and imperialism. This is the policy I have chosen with confidence.

— Suharto

Suharto's administration actively promoted the five principles as the supreme national ideology. They were framed as representing the ancient wisdom of the Indonesian people, pre-dating the introduction of foreign religions such as Hinduism and Islam. In a July 1982 speech reflecting his deep attachment to Javanese beliefs, Suharto glorified Pancasila as the key to reaching the perfect life (Javanese: ilmu kasampurnaning urip) in harmony with God and fellow humans.

The New Order also enforced the first precept's requirement of belief in one God, outlawing organizations that denied a supreme deity. Because Buddhism is non-theistic, the Buddhist revivalist Ashin Jinarakkhita reconciled it with Pancasila by presenting nibbāna as the Theravada equivalent of God and the primordial buddha Adi-Buddha—which he traced to the tenth-century Javanese text Sang Hyang Kamahayanikan—as the Mahayana conception of God.

In 1978, Suharto secured a resolution of the People's Consultative Assembly (Tap MPR No. 2/1978) establishing the Pancasila Appreciation and Practicing Guide (Pedoman Penghayatan dan Pengamalan Pancasila or P4). He subsequently initiated a mandatory indoctrination program for all Indonesians—ranging from primary school students to civil servants—to enforce the application of these national values. After initially taking care not to offend Muslim scholars who feared Pancasila might develop into a quasi-religious cult, Suharto secured another parliamentary resolution in 1983 (Tap MPR No. 11/1983) that made adherence to Pancasila mandatory for all organizations in Indonesia, public or private. In practice, the New Order exploited the ideological vagueness of Pancasila to legitimize its authoritarian acts, forbid criticism that could threaten government stability, and condemn political opponents as "anti-Pancasila".

=== Reform era ===
Following Suharto’s downfall in 1998, the coercive apparatus surrounding the Pancasila ideology—including the mandatory "sole basis" (asas tunggal) law and the state-sponsored indoctrination programs—was dismantled. The end of the New Order allowed for open, critical attitudes toward the state's historical use of Pancasila; nonetheless, post-Suharto Indonesia maintained a broad consensus in keeping Pancasila as the foundational state ideology. Proponents argue that rejecting the ideology would risk massive social fragmentation, weaken national unity, and lead to a loss of Indonesian civic identity.

Consequently, contemporary discourse frames Pancasila as an "open ideology," capable of constructive reinterpretation to suit modern state life. In the context of globalization, this ideological openness allows for the acceptance of foreign cultural elements, provided they do not conflict with Pancasila's core tenets.

During the Reform era, ideological debates resurfaced. The discourse has often been polarized between radical Islamist movements arguing that Pancasila contradicts Islam, and secular nationalists asserting that Pancasila is non-negotiable (harga mati). As the rise of transnational Islamist movements posed a perceived threat to social harmony, Pancasila experienced a political revival as a unifying countermeasure. However, critics warn that the ideology remains susceptible to misuse if future governments attempt to wield it as a tool for political intimidation, echoing New Order tactics.

In 2016, President Joko Widodo declared the anniversary of Sukarno's speech, June 1, a national holiday. Ayomi Amindoni (1 June 2016). "Jokowi declares June 1 as national holiday to commemorate Pancasila". The Jakarta Post. The following year, amid concerns that the public practice of Pancasila values had degraded into political rhetoric, the government re-established a dedicated body to promote the ideology. Joko Widodo created the Presidential Working Unit for the Implementation of Pancasila Ideology (Unit Kerja Presiden Pembinaan Ideologi Pancasila, UKP-PIP) on 19 May 2017 under Presidential Regulation No. 54/2017, and on 28 February 2018 elevated it to a permanent, non-ministerial body, the Pancasila Ideology Development Agency (Badan Pembinaan Ideologi Pancasila, BPIP), under Presidential Regulation No. 7/2018. Its Steering Committee (Dewan Pengarah) was chaired by former President Megawati Soekarnoputri, and the agency was tasked with coordinating and fostering the actualization of Pancasila values.

The agency drew public scrutiny over its executive compensation. Presidential Regulation No. 42/2018, signed on 23 May 2018, set the Steering Committee chair's monthly entitlement at Rp 112,548,000 and each member's at Rp 100,811,000, with the head of the executive agency receiving Rp 76,500,000. Because the figures exceeded the president's basic monthly salary, the regulation drew criticism from opposition politicians, and Finance Minister Sri Mulyani clarified that the entitlements were not wholly salary but also comprised allowances, insurance, and operational support.

BPIP also became the focus of disputes over religion and the state. In February 2020, BPIP head Yudian Wahyudi said in an interview with the news outlet detik.com that the greatest threat to Pancasila was religion rather than ethnicity—a remark he tied to groups he said politicized faith—drawing criticism from Islamic organizations and parliamentarians; he later said his words had been misunderstood. In August 2024, after the Pasukan Pengibar Bendera Pusaka (Paskibraka) flag-raising corps was placed under BPIP, 18 female Muslim members appeared without headscarves at the 79th Independence Day induction in the new capital, Nusantara; following condemnation by the Indonesian Ulema Council and others as a breach of constitutional religious freedom, BPIP apologized and the members wore the hijab at the 17 August ceremony.

== Criticism ==
Shield of the Pancasila. The bull represents democracy, the tree national unity, the chain humanity, the rice and cotton social justice, and the star represents God.

Some political scientists and scholars criticize Pancasila for lacking a solid theoretical foundation, describing it as overly broad and vague. Critics argue that this vagueness allows the ideology to function as an empty signifier, which can be manipulated to justify exclusionary or authoritarian policies depending on the prevailing political climate. Conversely, some defenders of the ideology argue that this generalization is a necessary feature, providing the flexibility required to manage Indonesia's extreme cultural diversity.

The International Humanist and Ethical Union (IHEU) has criticized the first sila for failing to protect the right to atheism or irreligion. The IHEU argues that this omission enables a culture of repression against atheists. Because Indonesian law officially recognizes only six religions (Buddhism, Catholicism, Confucianism, Hinduism, Islam, and Protestantism), human rights organizations argue that individuals who do not identify with these state-sanctioned faiths experience institutionalized discrimination.

Other critics argue that Pancasila has historically been weaponized to hinder liberal democracy and enforce authoritarianism. Legal scholars such as Pranoto Iskandar assert that Pancasila functions as a tool of Indonesian exceptionalism that criminalizes competing ideologies and preserves the political status quo. For example, the principle of decision-making through consensus (musyawarah mufakat) has been criticized as a pretext used by authoritarian regimes to suppress political opposition and individual rights. Furthermore, critics contend that the state's reliance on Pancasila rejects strict state neutrality, allowing religious conservatives to leverage the ideology to urge the state to prosecute religious minorities and accused heretics.

The legal enforcement of Pancasila has also drawn scrutiny regarding freedom of speech. In 2018, Islamic Defenders Front leader Muhammad Rizieq Shihab was charged under Articles 154a and 320 of the Criminal Code for allegedly insulting the state ideology and committing defamation, though the charges were later dropped.

== See also ==
- Armorial of Indonesia
- Constitution of Indonesia
- Pancasila economics
- National emblem of Indonesia
- Nasakom

== Works cited ==
- Agency for Fostering Pancasila Ideology (BPIP) (2022). Regulation of the Agency for Fostering Pancasila Ideology Number 4 of 2022 on Indicators of the Values of Pancasila (Official Translation) (PDF). Jakarta: Ministry of Law and Human Rights of the Republic of Indonesia.
- Anderson, Benedict (1961). Some Aspects of Indonesian Politics under the Japanese occupation, 1944-1945. Cornell University. Dept. Of Far Eastern Studies. Modern Indonesia Project. Interim reports series - Cornell University. Modern Indonesia Project. Ithaca, N.Y.: Cornell University.
- Arief Hidayat (2017). "Indonesia Negara Ketuhanan" [Indonesia is a Nation based on Belief in God] (PDF). mkri.id (in Indonesian). Constitutional Court of Indonesia.
- Arniati Prasedyawati Herkusumo (1982). Chuo Sangi-in: Dewan Pertimbang Pusat Pada Masa Pendudukan Jepang [Chuo Sangi-in: The Central Advisory Council during the Japanese Occupation] (in Indonesian). Jakarta, Indonesia: PT. Rosda Jayaputra.
- Cribb, Robert; Kahin, Audrey (2004). Historical Dictionary of Indonesia. Scarecrow Press. pp. 176–. ISBN 978-0-8108-4935-8.
- Daradjadi; Osa Kurniawan Ilham (2020). Pejambon 1945: Konsensus Agung para Pelatak Fondasi Bangsa [Pejambon 1845: The Great Consensus of the Nation's Founders] (in Indonesian). Jakarta: Kompas Gramedia. ISBN 978-623-00-2017-9.
- Eko Handoyo; Rahmat Petuguran; Heri Rohayuningsih (November 2018). Pertarungan Ideologi: Pancasila di Tengah Kepungan Ideologi-Ideologi Dominan [The Ideological Battlefield: Pancasila Surrounded by Dominant Ideologies] (PDF) (in Indonesian). UNNES Press. ISBN 9786022851356.
- Elson, R. E. (October 2009). "Another Look at the Jakarta Charter Controversy of 1945" (PDF). Indonesia. 88 (88): 105–130.
- Feith, Herbert (2008) [1962]. The Decline of Constitutional Democracy in Indonesia. Singapore: Equininox Publishing (Asia) Pte Ltd. ISBN 978-979-3780-45-0.
- Gisela Swaragita; Arya Dwipa (4 May 2018). "West Java Police drop defamation charges against FPI leader". The Jakarta Post.
- International Humanist and Ethical Union (10 December 2012). "Freedom of Thought 2012: A Global Report on Discrimination Against Humanists, and the Nonreligious" (PDF). IHEU.
- Kahin, George McTurnan (1952). Nationalism and Revolution in Indonesia. Ithaca, New York: Cornell University Press.
- Kosky (1999). Indonesia 1999: An Official Handbook. Jakarta: Indonesian Department of Information.
- Kusuma, A.B (2004). Lahirnya Undang-Undang Dasar 1945 : memuat salinan dokumen otentik badan oentoek menyelidiki oesaha2 persiapan kemerdekaan [The Birth of the 1945 Constitution: including copies of the authentic documents of the Investigating Committee for Preparatory Work for Independence] (in Indonesian). Depok, Indonesia: Badan Penerbit Fakultas Hukum Universitas Indonesia. ISBN 979-8972-28-7.
- Legge, John David (2003). Sukarno: A Political Biography. Singapore: Archipelago Press. pp. 101–102. ISBN 978-981-4068-64-2.
- Nasution, Adnan Buyung (1992). The Aspiration for Constitutional Government in Indonesia: A Socio-legal Study of the Indonesian Konstituante, 1956-1959. Pustaka Sinar Harapan. ISBN 9789794162187.
- Prawiranegara, Sjafruddin (October 1984). "Pancasila as the Sole Foundation" (PDF). Indonesia. 38 (38): 74–83. doi:10.2307/3350846. hdl:1813/53800. JSTOR 3350846.
- Ricklefs, M.C. (2008) [1981]. A History of Modern Indonesia Since c.1300 (4th ed.). London: MacMillan. ISBN 978-0-230-54685-1.
- Smith, Roger M., ed. (1974). Southeast Asia: Documents of Political Development and Change. Ithaca and London.
- Soeharto; Dwipayana, G.; Ramadhan, Karta Hadimadja (1991). Soeharto, My Thoughts, Words, and Deeds: An Autobiography. Citra Lamtoro Gung Persada. ISBN 9789798085017.
- Sukarno (1949). Lahirnya Pancasila [The Birth of Pancasila] (in Indonesian). Yogyakarta: InGuntur.
- Sukarno (1960). "Membangun Dunia Kembali" [To Build The World a New [sic]] (PDF) (in Indonesian). Archived from the original (PDF) on 3 July 2017.
- Ward, Ken (2010). "2 Soeharto's Javanese Pancasila". In Aspinall, Edward; Fealy, Greg (eds.). Soeharto's New Order and Its Legacy: Essays in Honour of Harold Crouch. Vol. 2. ANU Press. pp. 27–38. ISBN 9781921666476. JSTOR j.ctt24hc65.9.
- Amrizal; Wira Sugiarto; Suyendri; Zulfan Ikhram; Khairil Anwar; M. Karya Mukhsin; Risman Hambali; Khoiri; Marzuli Ridwan Al-bantany; Zuriat Abdillah; Dede Satriani; Wan M. Fariq; Suwarto; Adi Sutrisno; Ahmad Fadhli Saputra (15 October 2020). PROFIL ULAMA KARISMATIK DI KABUPATEN BENGKALIS: MENELADANI SOSOK DAN PERJUANGAN (in Indonesian). CV. DOTPLUS Publisher. ISBN 978-623-94659-3-3.
