= Indonesian Basketball Association =

Sports governing body

- Abbreviation: PERBASI
- Formation: 23 October 1951; 75 years ago
- Type: National Sport Association
- Headquarters: Basketball Building, Jakarta
- Location: Jakarta, Indonesia
- President: Budi Djiwandono
- Affiliations: FIBA, FIBA Asia, SEABA
- Website: https://www.indonesiabasketball.or.id

Persatuan Bola Basket Seluruh Indonesia (English: Indonesian Basketball Association), abbreviated as PERBASI, is the main basketball regulatory organization in Indonesia. Founded on 23 October 1951, the organization has its headquarters in Jakarta.

== History ==
The association was founded in 1952, when Tony Wen and Wim Latumeten requested by Maladi who was then serving as Secretary of KONI to develop basketball sports organizations Indonesia. On 23 October 1952, Indonesia basketball association formed under the name Persatuan Basketball Seluruh Indonesia abbreviated as PERBASI. Tony Wen positions as chairman and the secretary is Wim Latumeten. At 1955, the name was changed and adapted to the Indonesian vocabulary, become Persatuan Bola Basket Seluruh Indonesia, but still abbreviated as PERBASI.

Perbasi adheres to a tiered vertical system, starting from the association level, Perbasi branch administrators (pengcab), Perbasi regional administrators (pengda), up to the Perbasi general administrators (PB).

== Chairman ==
No	Name	Start job title	End job title
1	Tony Wen	1951	1959
2	Wim Latumeten	1959	1966
3	Soedirgo	1966	
4	Jonosewojo	1971	1986
5	Harmoko	1986	1998
6	Sutiyoso	1998	2004
7	Erick Thohir	2004	2006
8	Noviantika Nasution	2006	2010
9	Anggito Abimanyu	2010	2015
10	Danny Kosasih	2015	2024
11	Budi Djiwandono	2024	present

== Competitions ==
- Professional level
  - Indonesian Basketball League (IBL)
- Youth level
  - Development Basketball League (DBL)

== National teams ==
Men's

- Indonesia men's national basketball team
- Indonesia men's national under-18 basketball team
- Indonesia men's national under-16 basketball team

Women's

- Indonesia women's national basketball team
- Indonesia women's national under-18 basketball team
- Indonesia women's national under-16 basketball team

Men's 3x3

- Indonesia men's national 3x3 team

Women's 3x3

- Indonesia women's national 3x3 team
