= Yap Tjwan Bing =

Indonesian politician

Drs. Yap Tjwan Bing
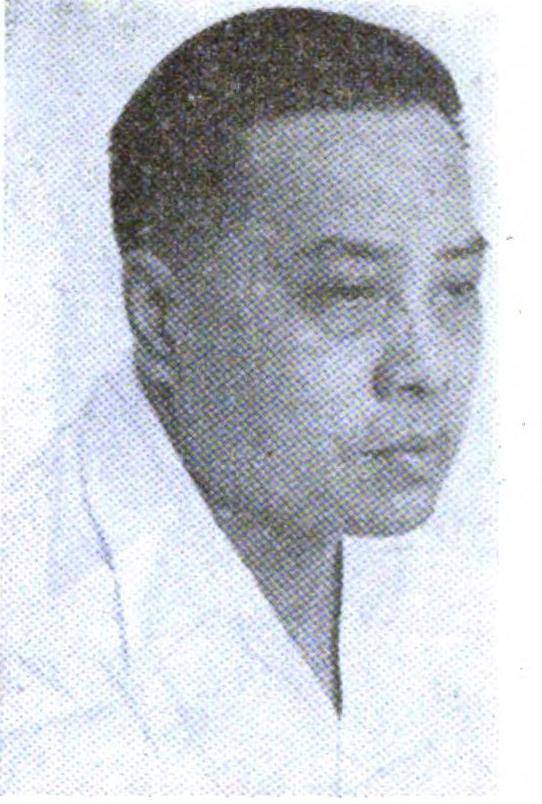

Member of the Provisional House of Representatives
- In office August 16, 1950 – July 17, 1954
- President: Sukarno
- Succeeded by: Tony Wen

Member of the House of Representatives of the United States of Indonesia
- In office February 17, 1950 – August 15, 1950

Member of the Central Indonesian National Committee
- In office August 29, 1945 – February 15, 1950

Member of the Preparatory Committee for Indonesian Independence
- In office August 7, 1945 – August 22, 1945

Personal details
- Born: October 31, 1910 Surakarta, Central Java, Dutch East Indies
- Died: January 26, 1988 (aged 77) Los Angeles, United States
- Education: Municipal University of Amsterdam

Drs. Yap Tjwan Bing was a politician of Chinese-Indonesian descent who actively contributed to the Indonesian independence movement and became a member of the Preparatory Committee for Indonesian Independence. His political career continued as a member of the legislature until 1954.

== Life and career ==
Yap was born in Surakarta, October 31, 1910. Various sources say that his nationalistic sentiments was already prevalent since the age of 18. He studied for a Bachelor of Pharmacy at the Municipal University of Amsterdam in 1932. After graduating, he returned to Indonesia and founded a pharmacy in Bandung.

In August 1945, Yap became a member of the Preparatory Committee for Indonesian Independence (PPKI). He was the only Chinese-Indonesian descendant in the PPKI. He attended the August 18, 1945 Session, where he helped formulate the 1945 Constitution and participated in the presidential and vice-presidential elections.

After the PPKI was dissolved, Yap joined the Central Indonesian National Committee (KNIP). Due to an incident that occurred during the early days of independence, where his pharmacy in Bandung was burned down by Indonesian youth, Yap moved to Yogyakarta. There, he founded the Chung Hwa Chung Hwee as part of an effort to unite the Chinese in support of Indonesian independence. However, in 1948 he dissolved the CHCH and merged it into the Chinese Association. Three years later, Yap returned to Bandung after the Second Dutch Military Aggression following several targeted attack by Republican forces against the Chinese.

His name was once associated with the Dutch-sponsored Pasundan State, where he was offered the position of Minister of Foreign Affairs. However, Yap declined the offer and later decided to support the Republic of Indonesia and chose to join the Indonesian National Party (PNI). In his autobiography, Yap emphasized that he preferred a party that could integrate Ethnic Chinese in Indonesia.

When the KNIP changed to the DPR-RIS when Indonesia adopted the federal system of government, Yap continued as a member of the DPR-RIS. When this federal system was dissolved on August 16, 1950 and the Provisional Constitution of 1950 was adopted, Yap joined as a member of the Provisional DPR as part of the Indonesian National Party (PNI) until he resigned on July 17, 1954 and was replaced by Tony Wen.

Outside of his political career, Yap is also active in professional associations, educational institutions, and social organizations. He became one of the first members of the Indonesian Pharmacists Association which was founded in 1955. In addition, Yap also served on the Board of Curators of the Bandung Institute of Technology and contributed to the establishment of the faculty of pharmacy Gadjah Mada University. Yap is also active in the Indonesian Christian Church, Bandung Permai, and also served as the principal of Pusipan High School.

== Later life and death ==
The Yap family became victims of a racial riot targeting ethnic Chinese in Bandung in 1963 known as the May 13, 1963 Incident. His car and villa were burned, while his wife feared that their polio-stricken son would be burned alive if another riot were to recur. Considering that he had lost much of his possessions in the riots, and that his son's condition required special care that could not be treated in Indonesia, Yap and his family decided to move to Los Angeles, United States, that same year. His wife sold her private home and pharmacy in order to starte a new life in there. Yap, then 53, switched careers to become a bank employee and then a pharmacist's assistant.

He has not set foot in Indonesia since. As his own health declined, Yap decided to settle in the US. He died in Los Angeles on January 26, 1988.

== Legacy ==
Sumartono Hadinoto, a community leader in Surakarta, said that Yap Tjwan Bing could be a role model, because of his commitment and struggle for Indonesian independence without regard to ethnicity, religion, or race. Yap wrote his autobiography Meretas Jalan Kemerdekaan in 1988, where at the end of the book he wrote about his hope for understanding between "natives" and "non-natives," of Indonesia, especially among young people.

As a form of honor for Yap's services, a street in Kampung Jagalan, Jebres, Surakarta, is named after him. The name change of "Jalan Jagalan" to "Jalan Drs Yap Tjwan Bing" was ratified by the then Mayor of Surakarta Joko Widodo on February 22, 2008.
