= Investigating Committee for Preparatory Work for Independence =

Japanese sponsored organization in Indonesia

Investigating Committee for Preparatory Work for Independence Badan Penyelidik Usaha-Usaha Persiapan Kemerdekaan 独立準備調査会 Dokuritsu Junbi Chōsakai

Type
- Type: Unicameral

History
- Established: 1 March 1945
- Disbanded: 7 August 1945
- Succeeded by: Preparatory Committee for Indonesian Independence

Leadership
- Chair: Rajiman Wediodiningrat (Javanese BPUPK)
- Chair: Mohammad Sjafei (Sumatran BPUPK)

Meeting place
- Pancasila Building

The Investigating Committee for Preparatory Work for Independence (Indonesian: Badan Penyelidik Usaha-Usaha Persiapan Kemerdekaan, abbreviated as BPUPK; Japanese: 独立準備調査会, Hepburn: Dokuritsu Junbi Chōsakai, Nihon-shiki / Kunrei-shiki: Dokuritu Zyunbi Tyoosa-kai), sometimes referred to, but better known locally, as the Investigating Committee for Preparatory Work for Indonesian Independence (Indonesian: Badan Penyelidik Usaha-Usaha Persiapan Kemerdekaan Indonesia, BPUPKI), (Note: "Indonesia" was not part of the name as the 16th Army only had authority over Java.) was an organization set up on 1 March 1945 by the Japanese military authority in Java during the Japanese occupation of the Dutch East Indies as the initial stage of the establishment of independence for the area under the control of the Japanese 16th Army. The BPUPK held two plenary meetings; the first was from 28 May to 1 June 1945 and the second was between 10 and 17 July 1945. A BPUPK was also established in Sumatra.

== Background ==
Realising Japan was losing the war, on 7 September 1944, in a session of the Japanese parliament, Prime Minister Kuniaki Koiso promised independence for the [Dutch] 'East Indies' at "sometime in the future". The Japanese navy was not supportive of the idea, but the 25th Army in Sumatra established a Central Advisory Council, headed by Mohammad Sjafei, which met only once. Despite navy opposition, army-navy liaison vice-admiral Maeda Tadashi began to fund speaking tours by Indonesian nationalists Sukarno and Hatta. Other groups were set up, both civilian and military, and Indonesians began to be appointed to administrative posts. After the Japanese defeat at the Battle of Leyte Gulf and the liberation of the Philippines, the Japanese abandoned hope of turning Indonesia into a puppet state, and now began to try and win goodwill. However, a rebellion by PETA militias in Blitar in February 1945 showed the Japanese they were losing control.

== Java ==
=== Formation and composition ===
In February 1945, partly in response to the Koiso declaration, the 16th Army decided to establish a committee to investigate Indonesian independence. According to Benedict Anderson, this was intended as a concession to Indonesian nationalists, and the Japanese hoped it would redirect nationalist enthusiasm towards harmless arguments between factions. The BPUPK was announced by the Sixteenth Army commander Lieutenant General Kumakichi Harada on 1 March 1945 to work on "preparations for independence in the region of the government of this island of Java". In the three months before the committee was established, a 19-member advisory board, or Sanyo Kaigi chaired by Sartono discussed the organization, agenda and membership of it. The membership was to comprise 30 Indonesians, 3 Japanese and one representative each of the Chinese, Arab and Dutch ethnic groups. The board agreed to the two-stage Japanese plan of an investigating committee for Java, followed by a preparation committee for all of Indonesia. It also agreed that the territory of the independent state would not be discussed. The BPUPK eventually met in the building formerly used by the Volksraad (People's Council), which had been set up by the Dutch. The Japanese appointed 59 members, representing the major groups in Java and Madura. The membership, which was announced on April 29, (coinciding with the birthday of Emperor Hirohito), included eight Japanese, including one of the vice-chairmen. Among the members were:

- Dr. Radjiman Wediodiningrat (chairman)
- Ichibangase Yoshio (vice-chairman)
- Soeroso (vice-chairman)
- Abdoel Gaffar Pringgodigdo (co-secretary)
- Sukarno
- Mohammad Hatta
- Besar Mertokusumo
- Mas Mansoer
- Ki Hajar Dewantara
- Agus Salim
- Soepomo
- Soetardjo Kartohadikusumo
- Abikusno Tjokrosujoso
- Bagus Hadikusuma
- Abdul Wahid Hasyim
- Muhammad Yamin
- Abdurrahman Baswedan
- Agus Muhsin Jasad
- Parada Harahap
- Liem Koen Hian (林群賢)
- Oey Tiang Tjoei (黄長水)
- Oei Tjong Hauw (黄宗孝)
- Tan Eng Hoa (陳英華)
- P. F. Dahler
- Akira Youka
- Hina Mayada
- Ryuka Honda

The Japanese vice-chairman, Ichibangase Yoshio (一番ヶ背 芳雄), was unable to understand Indonesian, the language used in the meetings.

=== Plenary sessions ===
==== First (28 May – 1 June 1945) ====
The opening ceremony took place on 28 May. It opened with a speech by the commander of the Japanese 16th Army, Lieutenant General Yuichiro Nagano, who said that independence was being granted to Indonesia to ensure good relations with Japan in the long term. There were speeches by other Japanese officials followed by the taking of a commemorative photograph. The meetings over the next four days consisted mostly of speeches by members and discussions about the ideology of an independent state, in particular whether there would be a role for Islam. On 31 May, Professor Soepomo called for an authoritarian integralistic state based on a combination of the systems in Nazi Germany and Imperial Japan, with a strong executive. He claimed that as each individual would be a part of the state, there would be no need for guarantees of human rights because the interests of the state and its citizens would be exactly the same. On the final day, 1 June, Sukarno made his famous speech in which he outlined the Pancasila - the five principles that would form the ideological basis of the new state. Although the speech was well-received, Islamic leaders were worried that their interests would not be protected under Pancasila. At the end of the BPUPK session, members were encouraged to discuss their views and hear opinions from the people at meetings held in their hometowns. A sub-committee of eight members, the panitia kecil (small committee), was set up with Sukarno as chairman to discuss the issues that had emerged.

==== Recess ====
The Central Advisory Council also established by the Japanese held a session from 18 to 21 June, and Sukarno, who chaired the body, took advantage of this to hold a meeting of the CAC members who were also members of the BPUPK. He also invited the BPUPK members who lived in Jakarta. Of the 47 people invited, 38 met and, prompted by Sukarno, established a nine-member committee, the panitia sembilan, to work on a draft constitution. This group included nationalists as well as Islamic figures, and on June 22 produced a draft preamble to the constitution including the wording of Pancasila, albeit in a different order from that in Sukarno's June 1 speech, with the religious obligation for Muslims. This was mostly the work of Muhammad Yamin, who named the resultant document the Jakarta Charter.

==== Second (10–17 July 1945) ====
This session debated and reached agreement on fundamental issues relating to the new nation, including its form, territory and constitution. On 10 July, a large majority of members (55) voted for independent Indonesia being a republic, rather than a monarchy (6 votes) or other type of state (2 votes). The next day, it was decided that the territory of Indonesia would include not only the Dutch East Indies, but also Malaya, North Borneo, Portuguese Timor, a concept known as Greater Indonesia (Indonesia Raya), which was strongly supported by Mohammad Yamin. This proposal garnered 39 votes, with 19 votes for a state limited to the territory of the Dutch East Indies and 6 votes for the Dutch East Indies plus Malaya.

The debate about the nature of the state continued. The main opposition to Soepomo's integralistic concept came from Muhammad Yamin, who favoured a liberal democracy similar to the United States, with separation of powers and a bill of rights. Other delegates called for an Islamic state, or at the very least, a constitutional obligation for Muslims to abide by Shariah law.

A sub-committee held meetings on 11, 13 and 15 July to discuss details of the constitution. All 27 members agreed to the final format on 15 July. As Soepomo played a dominant role in the drafting of the document, his views were manifested in its provision for a strong state. The constitution was approved by the BPUPK on 16 July, with only Yamin voting against it, apparently because he was unhappy at not having been included in the constitution drafting committee.

== Sumatra ==
On 25 July, a BPUPK was established by the Japanese 25th Army, in Sumatra, chaired by Mohammad Sjafei, head of the Sumatra Central Advisory Council, as chairman. The secretary was Djamaluddin Adinegoro. As well as the chairman and secretary, there were 22 members, including A.K. Gani, Teuku Hasan, Hamka and the Sultan of Asahan. It never met, but issued a statement of its resolve to strive for the Japanese Empire. The chairman and secretary had planned to travel around Sumatra making speeches. They set off on July 26, but the tour was cut short by the Japanese surrender.

=== Composition ===
The members of BPUPK in Sumatra were:

- Chairman: Mohd. Sjafei
- Secretary: Djamaluddin Adinegoro
- Members: Aceh: T. Njak Arif, Tgk. Mohd. Daud Beureu'eh
- Members: East Sumatra: Dr. Pirngadi; Dr. Amir; Mr. T. Mohd. Hasan; Hamka; Tgk. Saibun Abdul Jalil Rahmat Sjah, Sultan of Asahan; Hsu Hua Chang
- Members: Tapanuli: Dr. Ferdinand Lumban Tobing; Mr. Azairin
- Members: West Sumatra: Dt. Perpatih Baringek; A.R. Sutan Mansur; Chatib Soeleiman; Sjech Mohd. Djamil Djambek
- Members: Riau: Aminoeddin
- Members: Jambi: Dr. A. Sjagoff
- Members: Bengkulu: Ir. Indra Tjahaja
- Members: Palembang: Dr. A.K. Gani; Ir. Ibrahim; K.H. Tjik Wan
- Members: Lampung: Mr. Abdul Abbas
- Members: Bangka-Billiton: M.A. Sjarif

== Eastern islands ==
In the eastern islands, the Japanese Navy, the occupying authority, did not believe the inhabitants of the region were ready for independence. It allowed the establishment of a short-lived and impotent National Party chaired by the Sultan of Bone, but this was banned six weeks later. The stance by the Navy prompted Sukarno to send two pro-independence figures from the east, Sam Ratulangi and Tadjuddin Noor, who were in Java, back home to mobilize pro-independence forces.

== See also ==
- Preparatory Committee for Indonesian Independence (PPKI)
- Central Indonesian National Committee (KNIP)
- Timeline of the Indonesian National Revolution

== Works cited ==
- Anderson, Benedict (1961). Some Aspects of Indonesian Politics under the Japanese occupation, 1944-1945. Cornell University. Dept. Of Far Eastern Studies. Modern Indonesia Project. Interim reports series - Cornell University. Modern Indonesia Project. Ithaca, N.Y.: Cornell University.
- Butt, Simon; Lindsey, Tim (2012). The Constitution of Indonesia: A Contextual Analysis. Oxford & Portland, Oregon: Hart Publishing. ISBN 978-1-84113-018-7.
- Daradjadi; Osa Kurniawan Ilham (2020). Pejambon 1945: Konsensus Agung para Pelatak Fondasi Bangsa [Pejambon 1845: The Great Consensus of the Nation's Founders] (in Indonesian). Jakarta: Kompas Gramedia. ISBN 978-623-00-2017-9.
- Elson, R. E. (October 2009). "Another Look at the Jakarta Charter Controversy of 1945" (PDF). Indonesia. 88 (88): 105–130. Archived from the original (PDF) on August 15, 2018.
- Inomata, Aiko Kurasawa (1997). "Indonesia Merdeka Selekas-lekasnya: Preparations for Independence in the Last Days of Japanese Occupation". In Abdullah, Taufik (ed.). The Heartbeat of Indonesian Revolution. PT Gramedia Pustaka Utama. pp. 97–113. ISBN 978-979-605-723-8.
- Kahin, George McTurnan (1952). Nationalism and Revolution in Indonesia. Ithaca, New York: Cornell University Press.
- Kusuma, A.B (2004). Lahirnya Undang-Undang Dasar 1945 : memuat salinan dokumen otentik badan oentoek menyelidiki oesaha2 persiapan kemerdekaan [The Birth of the 1945 Constitution: including copies of the authentic documents of the Investigating Committee for Preparatory Work for Independence] (in Indonesian). Depok, Indonesia: Badan Penerbit Fakultas Hukum Universitas Indonesia. ISBN 979-8972-28-7.
- Kusuma, A.B.; Elson, R.E. (2011), "A note on the sources for the 1945 constitutional debates in Indonesia" (PDF), Bijdragen tot de Taal-, Land- en Volkenkunde, 167 (2–3): 196–209, doi:10.1163/22134379-90003589, ISSN 0006-2294
- Legge, John David (2003). Sukarno: A Political Biography. Singapore: Archipelago Press. pp. 101–102. ISBN 978-981-4068-64-2.
- Nasution, Adnan Buyung (1995), Aspirasi Pemerintahan Konstitutional di Indonesia: Studi Sosio-Legal atas Konstituante 1956-1956 (The Aspiration for Constitutional Government in Indonesia: A Socio-Legal Study of the Indonesian Konstituante 1956-1959) (in Indonesian), Jakarta: Pustaka Utama Grafiti, ISBN 978-979-444-384-2
- Reid, Anthony (October 1971). "The Birth of the Republic of Sumatra" (PDF). Indonesia. 12 (12): 21–46. doi:10.2307/3350656. JSTOR 3350656. Archived from the original (PDF) on October 20, 2019.
- Ricklefs, M.C. (2008) [1981]. A History of Modern Indonesia Since c.1300 (4th ed.). London: MacMillan. ISBN 978-0-230-54685-1.
- Soeripto, ed. (1962). Lahirnya Undang-Undang Dasar 1945 [Birth of the 1945 Constitution] (in Indonesian). Surabaya: Penerbitan Grip.
- Tan Malaka (2020). From Jail to Jail. Translated by Helen Jarvis. Ohio University Press. ISBN 9780896804043.
