= Preparatory Committee for Indonesian Independence =

Indonesian Axis collaborationist committee overseeing Indonesian independence

Preparatory Committee for Indonesian Independence Panitia Persiapan Kemerdekaan Indonesia 独立準備委員会 Dokuritsu Junbi Īnkai

Type
- Type: Unicameral

History
- Established: 7 August 1945
- Disbanded: 29 August 1945
- Preceded by: Investigating Committee for Preparatory Work for Independence
- Succeeded by: Central Indonesian National Committee

Leadership
- Chair: Sukarno
- Vice Chair: Mohammad Hatta
- Seats: 27 members

Meeting place
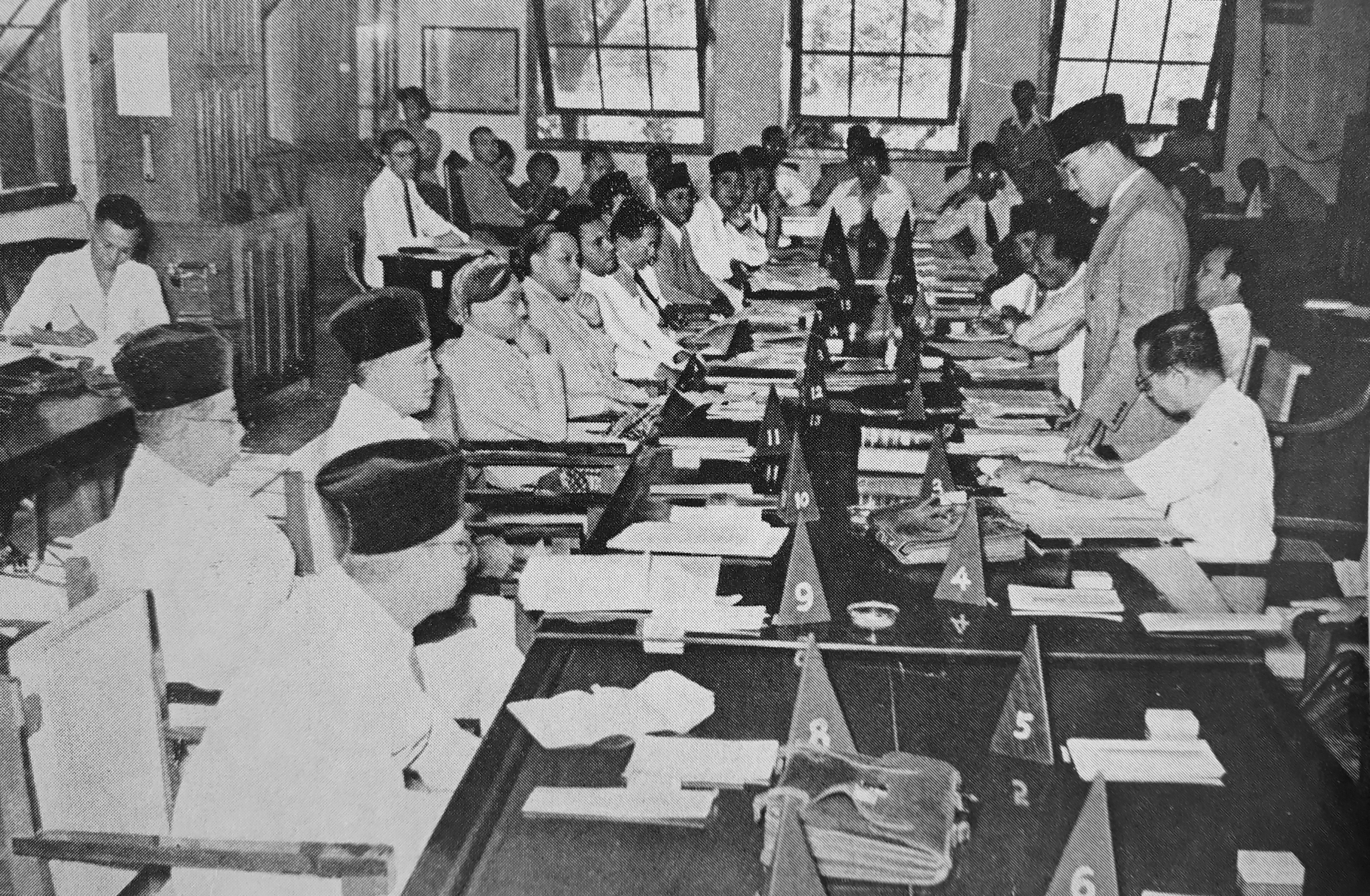
- Council of the Indies Building

The Preparatory Committee for Indonesian Independence (Indonesian: Panitia Persiapan Kemerdekaan Indonesia, abbreviated as PPKI; Japanese: 独立準備委員会, Hepburn: Dokuritsu Junbi Īnkai) was a body established on 7 August 1945 to prepare for the transfer of authority from the occupying Japanese to Indonesia. It approved and promulgated the first Constitution of Indonesia, and appointed Sukarno and Mohammad Hatta as the first president and vice president of Indonesia, respectively.

== Background ==
In two sessions from May to July 1945, the Investigating Committee for Preparatory Work for Independence (BPUPK) decided on Pancasila as the ideological basis of independent Indonesia, and produced a draft constitution. With the war turning against them, the Japanese, who were occupying Indonesia, decided to grant independence in order to create problems for the returning Dutch colonial authorities. The plan was that Java would become independent in early September, followed shortly by the rest of the country. On 7 August, the day after an atomic bomb was dropped on Hiroshima, Lt. General Hisaichi Terauchi, commander of the Japanese Southern Area who was based in Saigon, gave permission for the formation of the Preparatory Committee for Indonesian Independence (PPKI).

On 9 August, the day of the atomic bombing of Nagasaki, the Japanese authorities flew future president Sukarno, Mohammad Hatta and BPUPK chairman Radjiman Wediodiningrat to Da Lat, French Indochina for a meeting with General Hisaichi Terauchi, the commander of the Southern Area. He promised Indonesian independence would be granted on 24 August, and appointed Sukarno chairman of the PPKI. After delaying discussion of the extent of independent Indonesia when setting up the BPUPK, the Japanese finally clearly stated it would include the whole of the former Dutch East Indies, an idea the PPKI took over from the BPUPK. The three men flew back to Indonesia, arriving on 14 August. The Indonesian underground rejected any independence gifted by the Japanese, preferring to win it through force of arms. However, on 17 August 1945, two days after the Japanese surrender, Sukarno declared independence.

== Membership ==
Most of the 21 committee members appointed by the Japanese belonged to the older generation. Unlike the BPUPK, whose members only came from Java, the PPKI had representatives from Eastern Indonesia (under the control of the Japanese navy) and Sumatra (under the 25th Army).

=== Original ===
The membership comprised:

- Sukarno (chairman)
- Mohammad Hatta (vice-chairman)
- Soepomo (Java)
- Rajiman Wediodiningrat (Java)
- Suroso (Java)
- Sutardjo Kertohadikusumo (Java)
- Abdul Wahid Hasyim (Java)
- Ki Bagus Hadikusuma (Java)
- Oto Iskandar di Nata (Java)
- Abdul Kadir (Java)
- Soerjohamidjojo (Java)
- Poerbojo (Java)
- Mohammad Amir (Sumatra)
- Abdoel Abas (Sumatra)
- Teuku Muhammad Hasan (Sumatra)
- Sam Ratulangi (Sulawesi)
- Andi Pangerang Pettarani (Sulawesi)
- A. A. Hamidhan (Borneo)
- I Gusti Ketut Pudja (Lesser Sunda Islands)
- Johannes Latuharhary (Maluku Islands)
- Yap Tjwan Bing (Chinese community)

=== Later addition ===
Six additional committee members added without the approval of the Japanese authorities in Indonesia:

- Achmad Soebardjo (advisor)
- Sayuti Melik (Java)
- Ki Hajar Dewantara (Java)
- R.A.A. Wiranatakoesoema (Sunda/Java)
- Kasman Singodimedjo (Java)
- Iwa Koesoemasoemantri (Sunda/Java)

== Actions of the PPKI ==
The committee met for the first time on 18 August in the building in Jakarta formerly used by the Council of the Indies. It elected Sukarno as president and Hatta as vice-president of Indonesia. It established a seven-member commission, including Sukarno, Hatta, Soepomo and Muhammad Yamin, to approve the constitution that had been started by the BPUPK in July and to make other changes. One significant change was the removal from the constitution preamble of the obligation for Muslims to abide by Sharia law included in the Jakarta Charter as it was felt this would alienate Christians, as well as of the other religious faiths (Hinduism, Buddhism and Confucianism). The changes took less than a week, and the constitution was published in the 14 February 1946 edition of Berita Republik Indonesia, the government gazette. In the same meeting, the committee also decided that the president would be assisted by a national committee

On August 19, the committee met again and divided Indonesia into eight provinces: West, Central and East Java, Sumatra, Kalimantan, Sulawesi, Maluku and the Lesser Sundas. In its third and last meeting, held on August 22, the PPKI decided to establish the Central Indonesian National Committee (KNIP), a state party the Indonesian National Party (PNI) and the Badan Keamanan Rakyat (People's Security Agency) - the forerunner of the Indonesian National Armed Forces.

The committee was dissolved by Sukarno on 29 August and replaced by the KNIP.

== See also ==
- Investigating Committee for Preparatory Work for Independence (BPUPK)
- Central Indonesian National Committee (KNIP)
- Timeline of the Indonesian National Revolution
