= Rajiman Wediodiningrat =

National Hero of Indonesia

Kanjeng Raden Tumenggung Rajiman Wediodiningrat
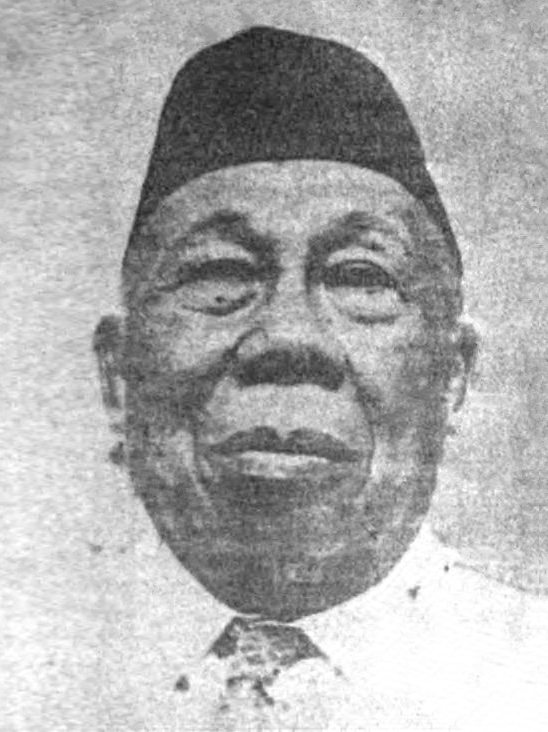
- Radjiman Wedyodiningrat, 1952
- Born: 21 April 1879; Yogyakarta, Dutch East Indies
- Died: 20 September 1952 (aged 73); Ngawi, Indonesia

Kanjeng Raden Tumenggung (K.R.T.) Radjiman Wedyodiningrat (21 April 1879 – 20 September 1952) was an Indonesian physician and one of the founding figures of the Indonesian Republic. He was a member of the Budi Utomo organization, in 1945 was elected to lead the Investigating Committee for Preparatory Work for Independence (BPUPK). On 9 August 1945, the day after the Atomic bombing of Nagasaki, Rajiman, along with nationalist figures Sukarno and Mohammad Hatta were flown to Saigon to meet with Field Marshal Hisaichi Terauchi, the Japanese commander of the Southern Expeditionary Army Group.

In 1950, having become a member of the legislature, the People's Representative Council (DPR), he led its first plenary session. Two years later, Rajiman died and was buried in Yogyakarta. He was named a National Hero of Indonesia on 8 November 2013.

== Early life and education ==
Radjiman was born on Thursday Pahing, 21 April 1879, in Yogyakarta, Dutch East Indies. His father, Ki Sutodrono, a former KNIL personnel, was a seventh-generation descendant of Kraeng Naba, the brother of Kraeng Galesong, a well-known ally of Trunojoyo during the 17th-century rebellion against the Mataram Sultanate. Unlike his brother, however, Kraeng Naba later became affiliated with the court of Mataram. On the other hand, Rajiman’s mother was of Gorontalo descent. He grew up in Lempuyangan.

Radjiman enrolled at the Tweede Europeesche Lagere School in Yogyakarta in 1886 and graduated in 1893 at the age of fourteen. He continued his studies at Sekolah Dokter Jawa (School tot Opleiding van Inlandsche Geneeskundigen) in Batavia with a scholarship, graduating on 22 December 1898 with the title of dokter Jawa (“Javanese doctor”). At that school, he befriended Sulaeman, the son of Wahidin Sudirohusodo, who was his contemporary, although Sulaeman was technically his distant nephew.

== Career ==
=== Physician ===
In January 1899, Radjiman began working at the Central Civil Hospital (CBZ) in Batavia. In May 1899, he was transferred to Banyumas with the assignment of eradicating smallpox in Kalirejo–Purworejo. In 1900, he was assigned to Semarang, where he worked in the surgery and autopsy department. From 1901 until 23 December 1902, he served at the General Hospital in Madiun, Central Java. Those regions that were relatively poor and remote at the time. His experiences there helped shape his social and political outlook.

Between 1903 and 1904, he served as an assistant lecturer at STOVIA.

On 5 November 1904, Radjiman graduated from STOVIA with the degree of Indisch (or Inlandsch) Arts. From 1904 to 1905, he served as a general physician in Sragen, while from 1905 to 1906, he was posted at the Mental Hospital in Lawang, East Java.

In 1906, Radjiman resigned from government service and was appointed physician to the Surakarta Palace, a position he held until 1934.

During his service as palace doctor, he continued his studies on medicines. In 1910, Radjiman pursued further medical studies at the University of Amsterdam, where he earned the degree of Europees Arts (European Physician) on 22 December 1910. The following year, he undertook advanced training in obstetrics, gynecology, surgery, and urinary cystoscopy in Berlin, Germany. Between 1919 and 1920, he studied radiology in Amsterdam. In 1930, Radjiman conducted a study visit to the United States, and in 1931, he continued his specialization in urinary cystoscopy in Paris, France, obtaining three professional certificates there.

Between 1915 and 1917, Radjiman played a key role in establishing a palace pharmacy within the Surakarta Sultanate, for which a Dutch pharmacist was brought in. The facility was named Panti Hoesodo and served as the royal dispensary. Following this initiative, he also founded a hospital, known as Panti Rogo, located in Kadipala. In addition, Radjiman organized training courses for traditional midwives (dukun bayi) to enhance their knowledge and practices in midwifery.

Honoring Radjiman's service in Surakarta Palace, Sri Sultan Paku Buwono X ultimately conferred an honorary title upon Radjiman, granting him the rank of Kanjeng Raden Tumenggung (KRT) with the name Wedyodiningrat.

After retiring from his assignment at the Surakarta Palace in 1934, Radjiman resided in Tretes, near Pandaan, East Java. Five years later, he moved to Dirgo, Walikukun, Ngawi.

=== Politics ===
At the First Congress of Budi Utomo held at the Kweekschool Yogyakarta on 3 October 1908, attended by around 300 participants, Radjiman Wediodiningrat delivered a speech emphasizing that the Javanese people should adopt Western knowledge selectively, while preserving their own cultural identity. Although his ideas were considered cautious and philosophical by more progressive members, they nonetheless influenced the early ideology of Budi Utomo.

At the Budi Utomo Central Board meeting in Yogyakarta on 9 September 1909, Radjiman Wediodiningrat rejected proposal of Cipto Mangunkusumo, a younger and more radical member, to open membership to all people born, living, or buried in the Dutch East Indies; Radjiman was backed by majority of the members which ultimately led to Cipto's resignation from the organization.

Radjiman served as Vice Chairman of Budi Utomo from 1914 to 1923. Since the establishment of the Volksraad (People’s Council), he was also a member of that body from 1918 to 1921.

Radjiman Wediodiningrat appeared as a speaker at the Javanese Cultural Development Congress in Surakarta from 5 to 7 July 1918.

Radjiman was appointed as chairman of Investigating Committee for Preparatory Work for Independence (BPUPK) on 29 April 1945.

Radjiman Wediodiningrat, along with Sukarno and Mohammad Hatta, traveled to Saigon to meet General Terauchi. The following day, Radjiman was appointed a member of the Preparatory Committee for Indonesian Independence (PPKI), while Sukarno and Hatta became Chairman and Vice Chairman, respectively.

Achmad Subardjo acknowledged Radjiman Wediodiningrat's capacity as a highly educated physician, his deep understanding of Javanese culture, and his wisdom in national politics. It was, therefore, unsurprising that he was later chosen as the Chairman of the Investigating Committee for Preparatory Work for Independence.

Radjiman was a member of the House of Representatives (DPR) from 1950 to 1952. During his tenure as representative, he frequently traveled between Jakarta and his residence in Walikukun, Ngawi, East Java.

== Death ==
When Sukarno, who was visiting Surakarta on an official trip, learned of Radjiman’s death, he traveled to Ngawi to pay tribute. Radjiman’s remains were initially placed at RS Kadipala in Surakarta at the request of the Surakarta Sultanate before being buried in Mlaten, Yogyakarta.

== Personal life ==
Rajiman had a sister, Marido, who died young, leaving two daughters. Through his paternal aunt, Wahidin Sudirohusodo was his cousin.

At some point in his life, Radjiman married Rohani, a woman from Pekalongan of Sumatran descent. At the early stage of the marriage, Radjiman and Rohani had two children but they died at an early age. The couple later adopted an infant named Asri, a grandchild of Wahidin Sudirohusodo. In 1906, Radjiman and Rohani had a child who survived infancy.

Rohani died in 1909 in Batavia. Later he married Karsinah, a Yogyakarta woman. In his second marriage, Radjiman had a son named Darmanu.

== Bibliography ==
- Deasy, Rani Melina; Joebagio, Hermanu; Susanto, Susanto (2020). "The Theosophy dr. K.R.T. Radjiman Wediodiningrat Towards Civic Intelligence". Proceedings of the 3rd International Seminar on Recent Language, Literature, and Local Culture Studies. EAI. doi:10.4108/eai.20-9-2019.2296702.
- Mangunwidodo, Soebaryo (1994). Dr. K.R.T. Radjiman Wediodiningrat : Perjalanan seorang Putra Bangsa 1879‑1952. Jakarta: Yayasan Dr. K.R.T. Radjiman Wediodiningrat. ISBN 9798700007.
- Sugito, A.T. (1985). DR KRT Radjiman Wediodiningrat: Hasil Karya dan Pengabdiannya (in Indonesian) (2nd ed.). Jakarta: Direktorat Sejarah dan Nilai Tradisional.
