= Wahid Hasyim =

Indonesian ulama and politician (1914–1953)

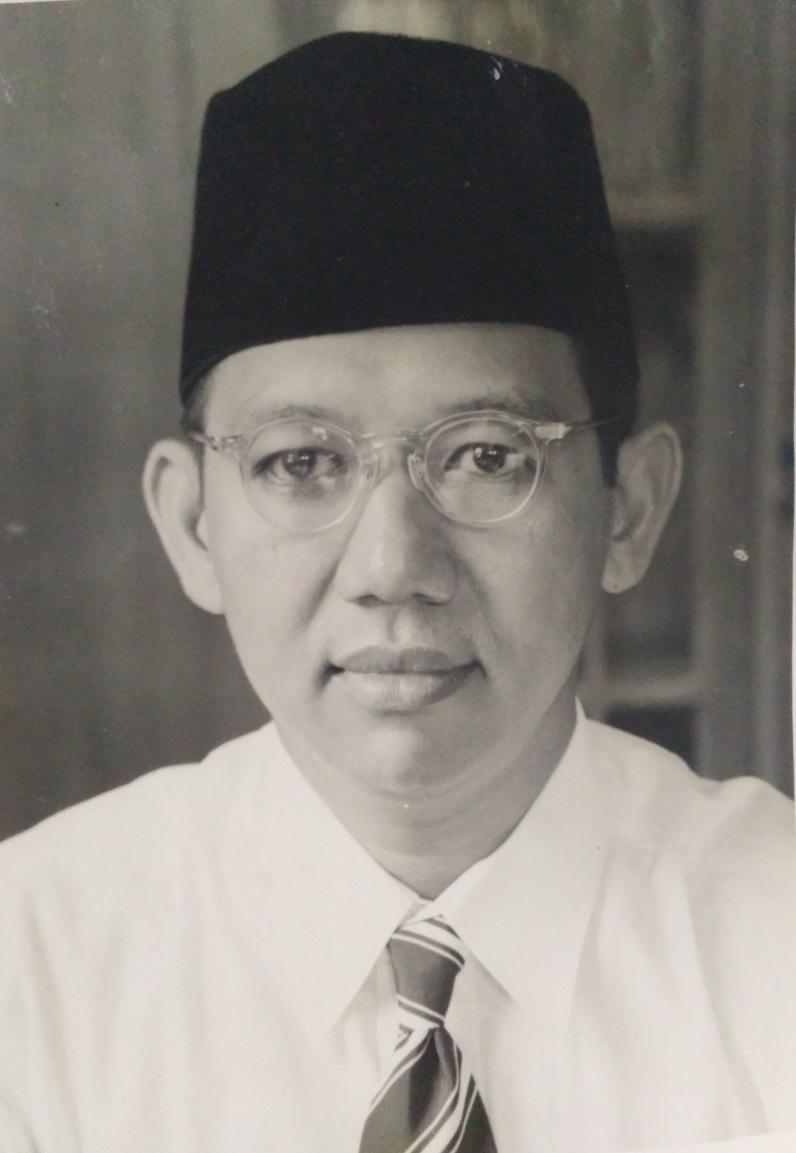
- Official portrait, 1953

1st Minister of Religious Affairs
- In office 30 September 1945 – 14 November 1945
- President: Sukarno
- Preceded by: None, new term
- Succeeded by: Rasjidi
- In office 6 September 1950 – 3 April 1952
- President: Sukarno
- Preceded by: Masjkur
- Succeeded by: Fakih Usman
- In office 20 December 1949 – 6 September 1950
- President: Sukarno
- Preceded by: Masjkur
- Succeeded by: Masjkur

Personal details
- Born: 1 June 1914 Jombang, East Java, Dutch East Indies
- Died: 19 April 1953 (aged 38) Cimahi, West Java, Indonesia
- Cause of death: Traffic collision
- Spouse: Siti Sholehah binti K.H. Bisri Syansuri
- Children: K.H. Abdurrahman Wahid; Aisyah Hamid Baidlowi; K.H. Salahuddin Wahid dr. Umar Wahid, Sp.P; Lily Chodijah Wahid; Hasyim Wahid

Abdul Wahid Hasyim (1 June 1914 – 19 April 1953) was an Indonesian ulama and politician. He served as the first Minister of Religious Affairs in the government of President Sukarno of Indonesia, from 1945 and from 1949 to 1952.

== Early life and education ==
Abdul Wahid Hasyim was born on 1 June 1914 in Jombang, a city in Jombang Regency, East Java, as the eldest child and son of the 15 children of Hasyim Asy'ari, an ulama (religious schjolar), and Nafiqah binti Ilyas. At the age of seven, he completed the Quran by learning from his father. By the age of 15, Hasyim was known to be proficient in the Latin script, Dutch, and English, despite never having received a colonial education. He began his education at the Madrasah Salafiyah within the Tebuireng Islamic boarding school (pesantren) and also deepened his knowledge at several other Islamic boarding schools, such as Pondok Siwalan in Panji, a historic institution in Sidoarjo. After spending a year at Pondok Siwalan, Hasyim moved to the Lirboyo Islamic boarding school in Kediri. He subsequently broadened his knowledge by subscribing to various domestic and international magazines and taking language courses in Dutch, Arabic and English. In 1932, Hasyim performed the Hajj in Mecca and remained there until 1933, using the time to further his religious studies. Upon returning from Mecca, although only 19 years old, he began to immerse himself in the movement, focusing primarily on enhancing the quality of Islamic boarding schools to cultivate intellectually minded students.

== Political career ==
Hasyim served as a member of the Nahdlatul Ulama (NU) Executive Board. In 1943, when the Japanese invaded the Dutch East Indies, all organizations were banned from operating, including Nahdlatul Ulama. The only Islamic organization permitted to operate was MIAI (Majelis Islam A'la Indonesia, the Supreme Islamic Council of Indonesia), which he led. This position placed him at the heart of the Indonesian nation's struggle during the Japanese occupation; he became a member of the Central Advisory Council (Chūō Sangiin), then the Investigating Committee for Preparatory Work for Independence (BPUPK), and eventually served on the Preparatory Committee for Indonesian Independence (PPKI).

== Personal life ==
In 1939, Wahid met Solehah, his cousin, at a wedding ceremony, and married her the same year. From this marriage, the couple had six children: Abdurrahman Wahid, Aisyah Hamid Baidlowi, Salahuddin Wahid, Umar Wahid, Lily Chodijah Wahid, and Hasyim Wahid.

== Death ==
Wahid died following a traffic accident on 18 April 1953, where the vehicle that he was riding on collided with a truck in Cimindi. His son, Abdurrahman Wahid, and Argo Sutjipto, the secretary of the central board of Nahdlatul Ulama, were also occupying the vehicle during the incident. Wahid and Sutjipto were severely injured and it took four hours before they were able to be transported to the nearest medical center, Borromeus Hospital. Abdurrahman survived the crash, but Wahid died on April 19, followed by Sutjipto the next day.
