= Sixteenth Army (Japan) =

Part of the Imperial Japanese Army during World War II

Japanese Sixteenth Army
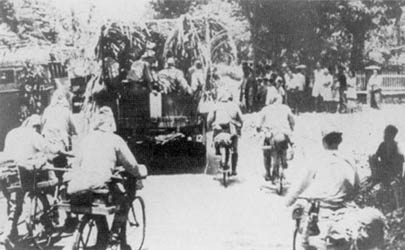
- Japanese troops enter Java
- Active: November 5, 1941 – August 15, 1945
- Country: Empire of Japan
- Branch: Imperial Japanese Army
- Type: Infantry
- Role: Corps
- Garrison/HQ: Batavia
- Nickname: Osamu (治)
- Engagements: Battle of Java (1942)

The Japanese 16th Army (第16軍, Dai-jyūroku gun) was an army of the Imperial Japanese Army during World War II.

== History ==
The Japanese 16th Army was formed on November 5, 1941, under the Southern Expeditionary Army Group to coordinate the infantry divisions and other Japanese ground forces in the Invasion of Java in the Netherlands East Indies. It remained based on Java throughout the Pacific War as a garrison force.

On March 27, 1944, with the threat of possible landings of Allied forces to retake the Dutch East Indies increasing, the organizational structure of the Southern Expeditionary Army changed and the IJA 16th Army was reassigned to the Japanese Seventh Area Army. It remained headquartered in Jakarta as a garrison force as before. The Japanese 16th Army was demobilized at the surrender of Japan on August 15, 1945.

== List of commanders ==
=== Commanding officer ===
	Name	From	To
1	General Hitoshi Imamura	6 November 1941	9 November 1942
2	Lieutenant General Kumakichi Harada	9 November 1942	26 April 1945
3	Lieutenant General Yuichiro Nagano	26 April 1945	September 1945

=== Chief of Staff ===
	Name	From	To
1	Lieutenant General Seizaburo Okazaki	6 November 1941	10 June 1943
2	Lieutenant General Shinshichiro Kokubu	10 June 1943	14 November 1944
3	Major General Shigeichi Yamamoto	14 November 1944	September 1945
