= Iskaq Tjokrohadisurjo =

Indonesian politician and advocate (1896–1984)

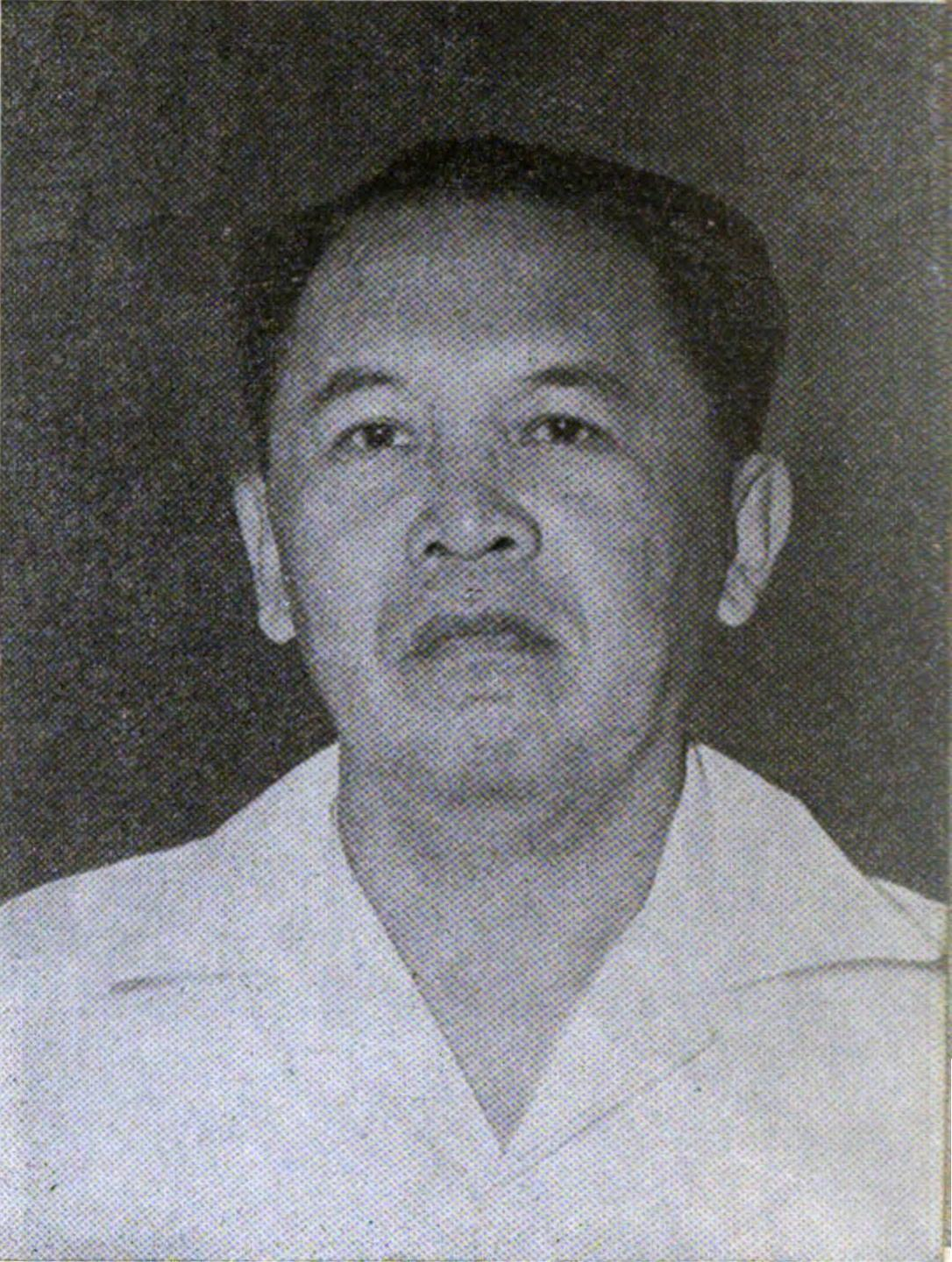
- Official portrait, 1954

Minister of Economic Affairs
- In office 30 July 1953 – 8 November 1954
- Prime Minister: Ali Sastroamidjojo
- Preceded by: Soemanang Soerjowinoto
- Succeeded by: Roosseno

Minister of Home Affairs
- In office 27 April 1951 – 3 April 1952
- Prime Minister: Soekiman Wirjosandjojo
- Preceded by: Assaat Datuk Mudo
- Succeeded by: Mohammad Roem

Resident of Surakarta
- In office July 1946 – November 1946
- Preceded by: Sindoeredjo
- Succeeded by: Sjamsuridjal

Personal details
- Born: 11 July 1896 Jombang Regency, Soerabaja Residency, Dutch East Indies
- Died: 11 September 1984 (aged 88) Jakarta, Indonesia
- Party: PNI (until 1973)
- Other political affiliations: Partindo; Parindra
- Education: Leiden University (Mr.)
- Occupation: Politician; advocate

Iskaq Tjokrohadisurjo (Note: Spelling under the Republican Spelling System used from 1947 to 1972. Under the previous Van Ophuijsen Spelling System, his last name was spelled as Tjokrohadisoerjo. Other variations include Tjokroadisurjo. Meanwhile under modern Indonesian orthography, his last name would be spelled as Cokrohadisuryo.) (11 July 1896 – 11 September 1984) was an Indonesian politician and advocate. A member of the Indonesian National Party (PNI), he served as minister of home affairs from 1951 to 1952 and minister of economic affairs from 1953 to 1954.

Born in Jombang, Iskaq was educated in law and received higher education at Leiden University after a five-year career in various colonial courts. He was one of the earliest native Indonesian advocates during the Dutch colonial period, founding multiple law offices across the country. Iskaq also took part in the Indonesian nationalist movement. He was a co-founder of the PNI and was also arrested along with its other leaders in 1929.

During the Indonesian National Revolution, Iskaq briefly served as the resident of Banyumas and mayor of Surakarta. He then served as minister of home affairs in the Sukiman Cabinet, where his policies favoring the (PNI) were controversial for other parties, and was replaced in the succeeding Wilopo Cabinet. Iskaq returned to government office as minister of economic affairs in the First Ali Sastroamidjojo Cabinet, but he became entangled in a graft scandal. He was found guilty and sentenced to prison, but he received a pardon from President Sukarno. He remained active in the PNI and attempted to reunite the party during a 1965 split, until withdrawing from party politics after PNI's fusion into the Indonesian Democratic Party in the New Order period.

== Early life and career ==
Iskaq was born in the village of Ngepeh, in Jombang Regency, on 11 July 1896. His parents were Javanese nobility, and his father worked as a civil servant for the colonial government. Iskaq began schooling at a village school (Volksschool), before moving to Nganjuk to enter Europeesche Lagere School between 1904 and 1911. He continued his studies at Rechts-Hogeschool (Law High School) in Batavia, and between 1917 and 1922 he worked in legal courts - initially as an assistant at the district courts of Madiun and Ponorogo, then as a jury in Magelang, a clerk at the high court in Surabaya, and finally a judge at the district court in Semarang. He then enrolled at the University of Leiden, graduating in 1925 and being awarded a Meester in de Rechten (Master of Laws) title.

While the nationalist student organization Perhimpoenan Indonesia was active in Leiden, Iskaq was not active in the organization, as he was working at the stock market and did not want to risk his employment. He was still interested in politics, however, and when he graduated on 30 June 1925 and returned to Java in 1926, he decided against working for the colonial government. According to Iskaq in a 1971 interview, his decision was motivated by his more egalitarian treatment in the Netherlands compared to his treatment by colonial authorities back home.

== Early political career ==
Upon his return from Leiden, Iskaq founded the first native Indonesian law office in Batavia along with several other such as future parliamentary speaker Sartono and future prime minister Ali Sastroamidjojo. He later moved to Bandung and founded another law office there (as he had a Dutch wife, whom he thought would fit in better in Bandung), and left leadership of the Batavia office to Sartono. He was one of the founders of the General Study Club (Algemeene Studieclub) in Bandung, formed on 29 November 1925. Iskaq co-founded the Indonesian National Party (PNI) in 1927, and in its initial provisional leadership he was appointed as secretary/treasurer while future President Sukarno served as chairman. Iskaq had also prepared the provisional statutes for the organisation.

In 1929, along with Sukarno and a few others, Iskaq was arrested due to involvement in PNI – and then shortly after released, under the conditions that he not return to Batavia or Bandung. He moved to Surabaya and set up a law office there (also the first native Indonesian law office in the city), and then to Makassar in 1930, setting up another office. He then left for Manado, leaving the Makassar office to future foreign minister Soenario, and set up yet another law office. In 1933, he returned to Surabaya, and worked as an advocate at the Surabaya High Court. Iskaq's Batavia office was highly involved in politics, with many of the advocates there being PNI members. Iskaq later became a member of another nationalist political party Partindo, before later joining the Great Indonesia Party (Parindra) after Partindo's dissolution. According to Iskaq in his autobiography, he had encountered a Japanese agent at Bangkok in mid-1941, and Iskaq provided the agent with "all the information [he] could". During the Japanese occupation of the Dutch East Indies, Iskaq was made the assistant resident of Banyumas, and was appointed into the Central Advisory Council, a representative body.

Following the surrender of Japan and the proclamation of Indonesian Independence, Iskaq became the resident, and facilitated negotiations of the disarming of 450 Japanese troops in Banyumas - hence giving their weapons to the nationalist units under the command of General Sudirman. He also abolished a traditional system of tax-exempt religious villages in Banyumas. On 18 July 1946, Iskaq was appointed as resident of Surakarta, with local militia figure Sudiro as his deputy. As part of this office, Iskaq and Sudiro organized the region, previously under the Surakarta Sunanate and Mangkunegaran administration during the colonial period, into a regular Residency. To this end, they merged the former territories of the two princely states and reorganized them into the city of Surakarta and the regencies of Sukoharjo and Karanganyar. In November 1946 they were kidnapped by communists, although they were shortly after released after pressure from the Republican government in Yogyakarta. Iskaq later took part in the Renville Agreement, a meeting between Indonesian and Dutch leaders to demarcate boundaries between territories controlled by the two sides. Iskaq was secretary to the Indonesian delegation.

== Cabinet Minister: 1951–1954 ==
=== Home Affairs Minister ===
Iskaq's first cabinet post was as Minister of Home Affairs under Prime Minister Soekiman Wirjosandjojo. Some two weeks after his appointment, Iskaq issued an order to cease the functioning of regional legislatures. This order brought him into conflict with the Masyumi Party (which had strong representation in the legislatures), and the dispute ended in a compromise whereas no new regional legislatures would be formed and the existing ones would be replaced based on existing regulations at a later time. His decision to appoint Sanusi Hardjadinata, a member of the PNI, to the Masyumi stronghold of West Java, and Sudiro, an ethnic-Javanese for Sulawesi, caused political controversy. These appointments resulted in a motion to censure Iskaq, which failed to pass. In July 1951, Iskaq agreed with the DPV (a Dutch tobacco plantation company based in North Sumatra) to return half of its plantation (130,000 out of 255,000 hectares), which had by now been occupied by local farmers. While Soekiman's government did not act much on this agreement, its successor, the Wilopo Cabinet did attempt to enforce the agreement in 1953. This resulted in several clashes between the farmers and police in Tanjung Morawa, resulting in deaths of five people. The political firestorm that ensued as a result of the affair, caused the downfall of the Wilopo Cabinet.

Regarding the question of Acehnese autonomy, Iskaq attempted to assert central government authority by transferring administration some areas to East Sumatra and Tapanuli, replacing a number of officials, and in March 1952 he terminated the tenure of incumbent Acehnese governor Daud Beureu'eh. Following the dissolution of the Soekiman Cabinet, a new cabinet was formed led by Prime Minister Wilopo, who dismissed Iskaq from his post due to the Masyumi's objections of his policies. He was replaced as Minister of Home Affairs by Mohammad Roem. Following his dismissal, Iskaq had also founded the 17 August 1945 University in 1952, as part of the 17 August 1945 educational foundation. He would serve as the foundation's chairman until mid-1982.

=== Economic Affairs Minister ===
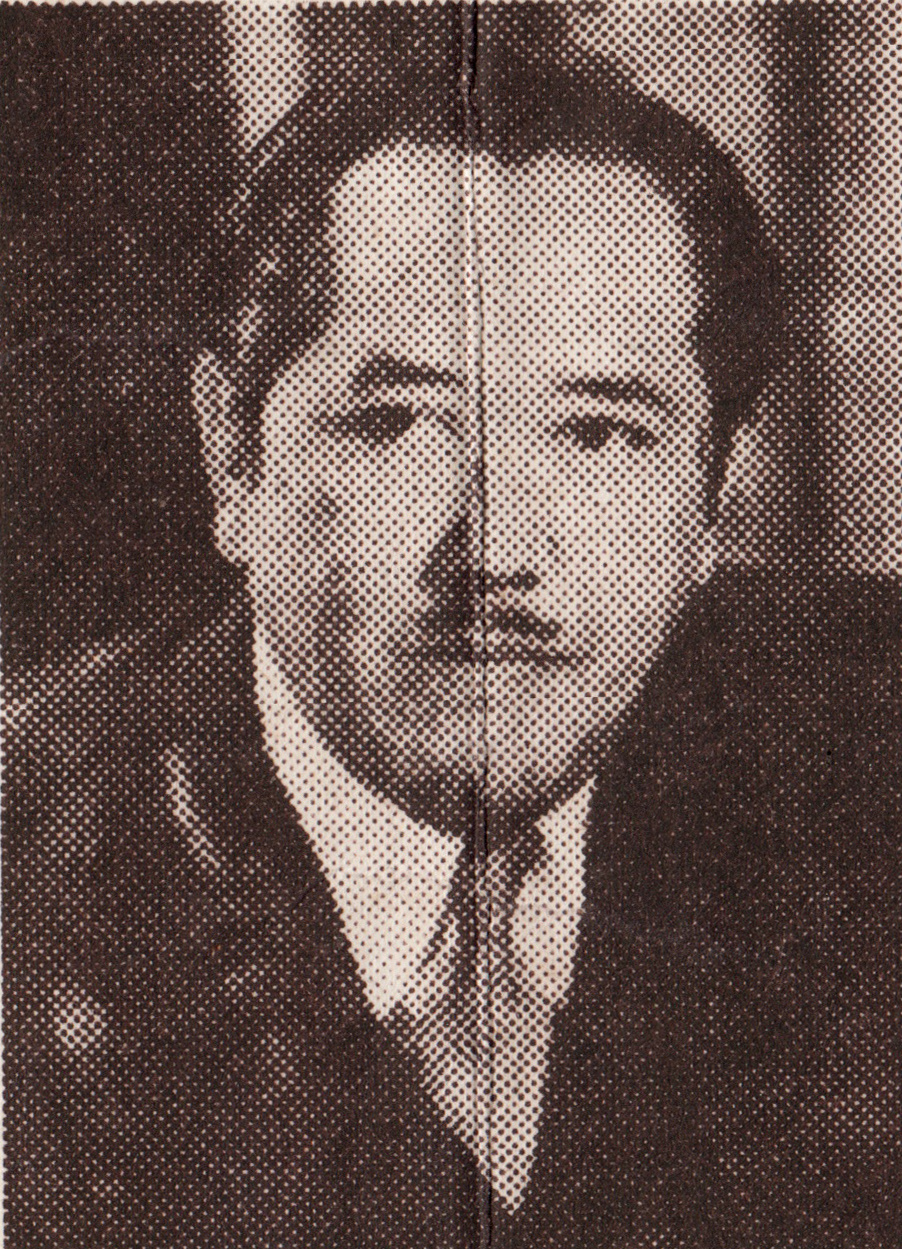
Prime Minister Ali Sastroamidjojo (1903–1975), under whom Iskaq served as Minister of Economic Affairs

Iskaq returned to a cabinet post as the Minister of Economic Affairs in the First Ali Sastroamidjojo Cabinet. Under Iskaq's ministership, access to foreign exchange for import was significantly restricted, with a ministerial decree in August 1954 assigning 80-90 percent of foreign exchange being assigned to indigenous importers with licenses. While the decree was later revoked, it still saw some enforcement, and led to the growth of "Ali Baba" partnerships with an indigenous license-holder and a Chinese Indonesian trader, and there was widespread corruption in the licensing process. Iskaq's policy was controversial, being opposed by economists such as Minister of Finance Ong Eng Die, Bank Indonesia chairman Sjafruddin Prawiranegara and alienating coalition parties such as Nahdlatul Ulama and the Indonesian Islamic Union Party. The licenses were also often issued at a marked up price, with the issuance of the licenses benefitting the PNI financially. Iskaq himself admitted that licenses were often sold at over twice its face value.

Additionally, Iskaq also replaced many high-ranking officials of state-owned banks and government bodies under the ministry with PNI members. This was again controversial to other parties, with a motion of no confidence filed against him by Masyumi politicians in April 1954. While the parliament had attacked Iskaq's policies as early as October 1953, alleged favoritism of firms related to PNI caused some parliament members in the government coalition to vote against Iskaq, though the motion was still defeated. Eventually, following pressure from coalition members and a cabinet crisis caused by the withdrawal of the Great Indonesia Unity Party from the cabinet, Ali Sastroamidjojo conducted a cabinet reshuffle, replacing Iskaq with Roosseno Soerjohadikoesoemo on 8 November 1954.

=== Corruption allegations ===
During Burhanuddin Harahap's premiership, Attorney General Soeprapto summoned Iskaq for questioning in August 1955, when Iskaq had left for the Netherlands to enroll his son at a special education school. While a number of officials at the import licenses office were arrested, Iskaq was only investigated and not prosecuted upon his return to Indonesia in April 1956. He was again investigated in April 1958, and was formally accused of graft. In response to the trial and media accusations of him obtaining personal financial benefits from office, Iskaq publicized his financial situation, with him receiving dividends from a number of firms, serving in a board of a pharmaceutical company, and owning a substantial amount of shares in a Dutch insurance company. Iskaq also maintained his private law practices and worked there when not in office. Iskaq was eventually convicted of nine months in prison, fined, and had some of his assets seized. His appeal was rejected, but he received a pardon from President Sukarno, whom he had co-founded the PNI with.

== Later career and death ==
In late 1965, following an attempted coup, internal disputes within PNI arose from the suspension of members such as Osa Maliki, Hadisubeno Sosrowerdojo and Hardi. Iskaq attempted to organize a committee to reunite the party, but this was not accepted by the incumbent leadership led by Party Chairman Ali Sastroamidjojo. He attempted to organize a party congress ahead of schedule, but this did not bear fruit and instead meetings between the opposing factions were organized by Suharto in March 1966. Iskaq was appointed as chairman for an emergency party congress, which was held on 24 April 1966 in Bandung. During the congress, many delegations who supported Ali's leadership were restricted or arrested, with the military being friendly to Osa Maliki's faction of the party. Following private negotiations, Ali acquitted to Osa's demands, and Osa was made chairman of PNI. Following the PNI's poor performance in the 1971 legislative election, the party was merged into the Indonesian Democratic Party in 1973. Iskaq refused to participate in the new party, instead founding the "Marhaenism Foundation" in 1980 and the "Indonesian National Movement" in 1982 in an attempt to organize former PNI members. He died on 11 September 1984 due to a heart attack and related complications.
