= Sidik Djojosukarto =

Indonesian politician (1908–1955)

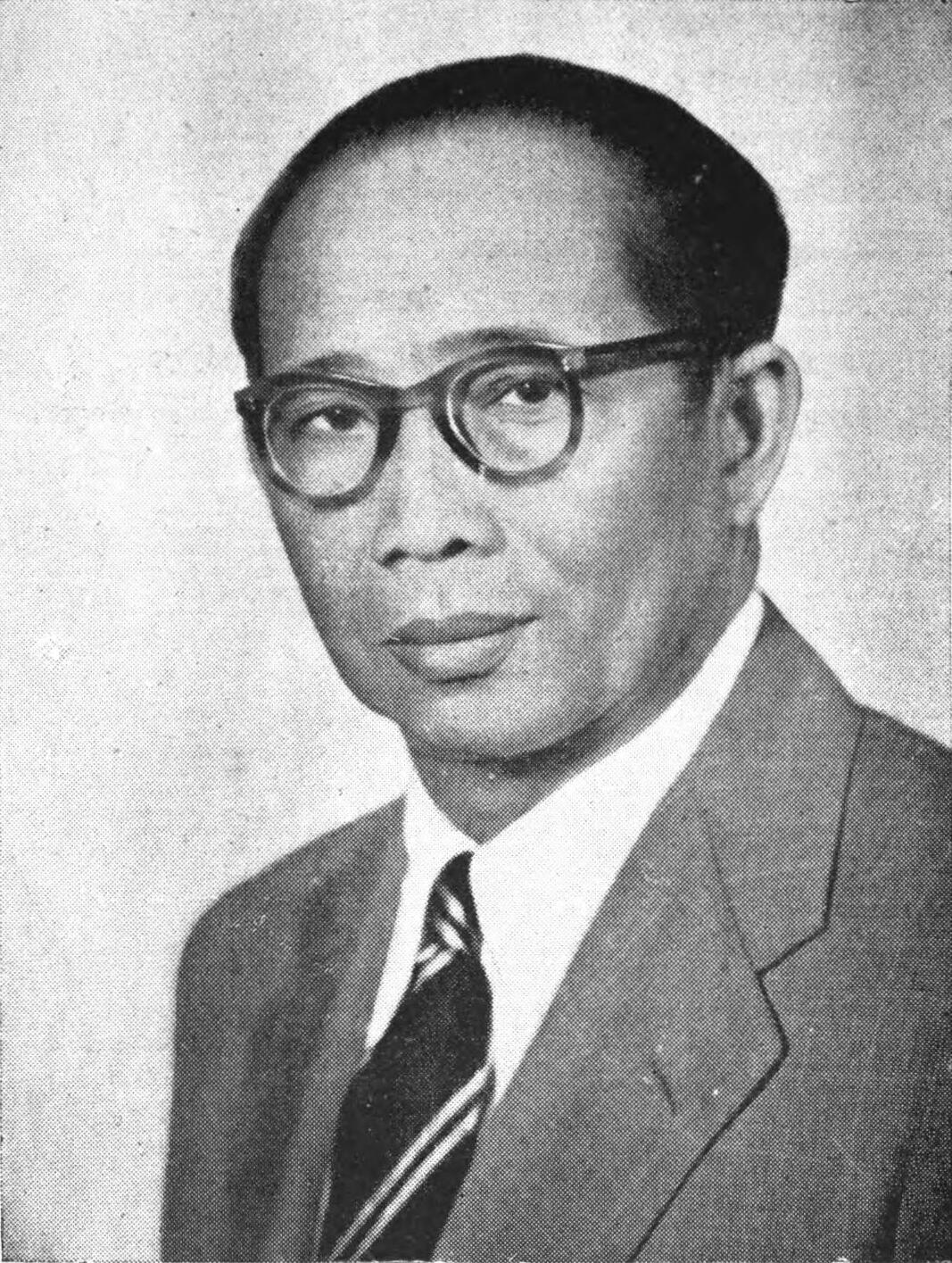
- Official portrait, 1954

Chairman of the Indonesian National Party
- In office 5 May 1950 – 9 September 1955
- Preceded by: Sujono Hadinoto
- Succeeded by: Suwiryo

Member of the Provisional House of Representatives
- In office 16 August 1950 – 9 September 1955

Member of the Central Indonesian National Committee
- In office 26 February 1946 – 16 August 1950

Personal details
- Born: 7 June 1908 Blitar, Dutch East Indies
- Died: 8 September 1955 (aged 47) Surabaya, Indonesia
- Party: PNI (from 1946)
- Other political affiliations: Partindo; Gerindo
- Occupation: Politician; journalist

Sidik Djojosukarto (EVO: Sidik Djojosoekarto; 7 June 1908 – 8 September 1955) was an Indonesian politician who served as chairman of the Indonesian National Party (PNI) from 1950 until his death. As PNI chairman, he was revered by all party factions, and was the closest to being an "authentic party hero."

Sidik was born to a small merchant family in Blitar, East Java. After graduating from the Ovts Handelsleergang trade school in 1930, he began work as a teacher in Surabaya. Later, he became a journalist and was later editor-in-chief of the Indonesian newspaper Berdjoeang. In addition to his work as a journalist, Sidik was involved in several pro-independence organizations, becoming a member of the Partindo and Gerindo political parties during the 1930s. During the Japanese occupation of the Dutch East Indies, Sidik became the local head of the Putera and Jawa Hokokai organizations in Kediri.

Following the proclamation of Indonesian Independence, he became chairman of the local branch of the Indonesian National Committee. In 1946, he was appointed a member of the Central Indonesian National Committee (KNIP) and became a member of the KNIP's working body by March 1947. In August 1949, he was appointed acting chairman of the PNI, replacing Sujono Hadinoto. As party chairman, Sidik represented the more conservative faction of the PNI and led the party through much of the liberal democracy period. He died of hypertension on 8 September 1955, while campaigning during the 1955 Indonesian legislative election.

== Early life and career ==
Sidik Djojosukarto was born to a small merchant family on 7 June 1908, in Blitar, East Java, in what was then the Dutch East Indies (now Indonesia). Sidik began his education at a Hollandsch-Inlandsche School in Blitar before then attending the Meer Uitgebreid Lager Onderwijs school in Kediri and later Madiun, where he graduated in 1927. In 1930, he graduated from the Ovts Handelsleergang trade school and began working as a teacher in Surabaya's People's College. Sidik didn't last long as a teacher, being fired for his opposition to the policies of the colonial government.

After being fired, he then transitioned to becoming a journalist and was later editor-in-chief for the Indonesian newspaper Berdjoeang. However, the newspaper was banned by the colonial government, as it was considered subversive and dangerous. In addition to his work as a journalist, Sidik was also involved in several pro-independence organizations. In his youth, he had been a member of the Jong Java and later Indonesia Moeda organizations. During the 1930s, Sidik joined the Partindo and later Gerindo political parties.

== Japanese occupation ==
During the Japanese occupation of the Dutch East Indies, Sidik became the local head of the Putera and later the Jawa Hokokai organizations in Kediri. In 1945, following the proclamation of Indonesian Independence, he was elected chairman of the local branch of the Indonesian National Committee, and was the head of the Indonesian National Party (PNI) branch in East Java. In 1946, he was appointed a member of the Central Indonesian National Committee (KNIP) in 1946, and in March 1947, he became a member of the KNIP's working body.

== Chairman of the PNI ==
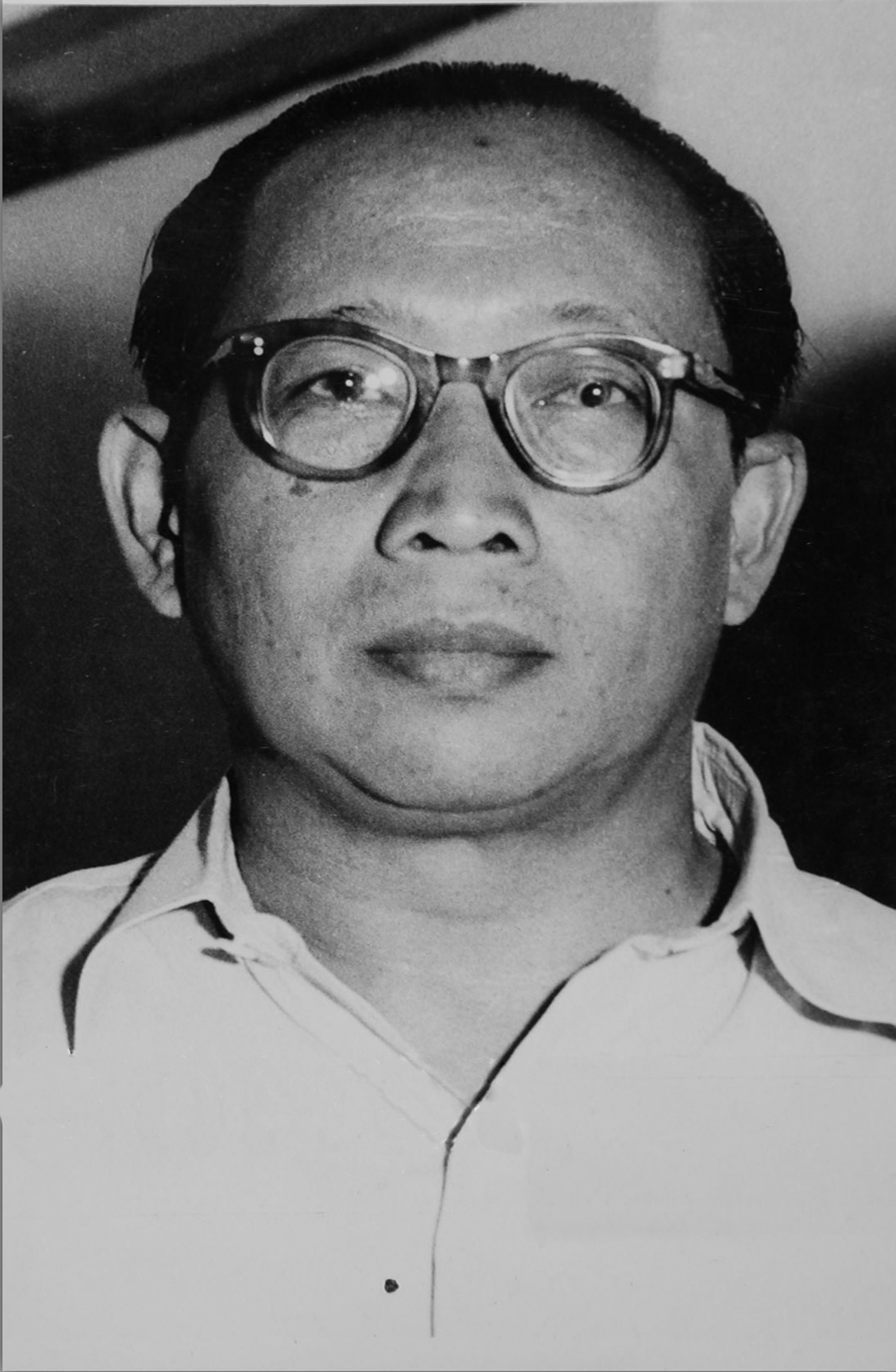
Sidik Djojosukarto in 1949

In 1949, following PNI Chairman Sujono Hadinoto's departure to the Netherlands as a part of the Indonesian delegation to the Dutch-Indonesian Round Table Conference, he was appointed acting chairman of the party. In 1950, Sidik was officially elected party chairman in the PNI's fourth congress in Yogyakarta. He represented the radical nationalist wing of the PNI, and during his leadership, the wing increased its control over the party, spearheading the drive for the creation of a unitary state, and opposing both the Hatta and Natsir cabinets. After the collapse of the Natsir cabinet, Parliamentary Speaker Sartono was given the task of forming a government; however, he returned his mandate to President Sukarno after not being able to form a cabinet.

On the same day that Sartono withdrew, Sukarno appointed Sidik and Soekiman Wirjosandjojo of the Masyumi Party as formateurs. Sidik announced a PNI program of action if its members entered the government, the program included the liquidation of the Netherlands-Indonesia Union and the revision of the Round Table Conference. After several weeks of negotiations, both parties agreed to an equal share of posts in the cabinet, with the Masyumi returning to the office of prime minister. On 1 March 1952, Sukarno appointed Sidik and Prawoto Mangkusasmito of the Masyumi Party for the creation of a new cabinet. When Prawoto and Sidik failed to reach an agreement, Sukarno appointed former Labor Minister Wilopo as formateur.

== Death and legacy ==
While visiting the Indonesian National Party branch in East Java, Sidik grew fatigued and was brought to the Surabaya General Hospital on 6 September 1955, accompanied by future PNI chairman Ali Sastroamidjojo. There, the doctors diagnosed him with hypertension, caused by his campaigning activities for the upcoming legislative elections. He died on 8 September 1955, at the same hospital. His body was buried in his family's grave in Blitar on 9 September 1955.

The burial ceremony was attended by President Sukarno, Sukarno's wife Hartini, and several other major figures. PNI vice chairman, Ki Sarmidi Mangunsarkoro, gave a short speech during the ceremony. During the speech, he pointed to the heavy loss that the PNI has suffered due to Djojosukarto's death. In addition to the PNI, Mohammad Natsir of the Masyumi Party have a short speech on behalf of the party. He stated that the passing of Sidik Djojosukarto called Natsir a great loss for his family and his party. His death became headline news in several PNI-affiliated newspapers, including the left-wing nationalist Berita Indonesia paper.
