= Usep Ranawidjaja =

Indonesian politician (1924–2010)

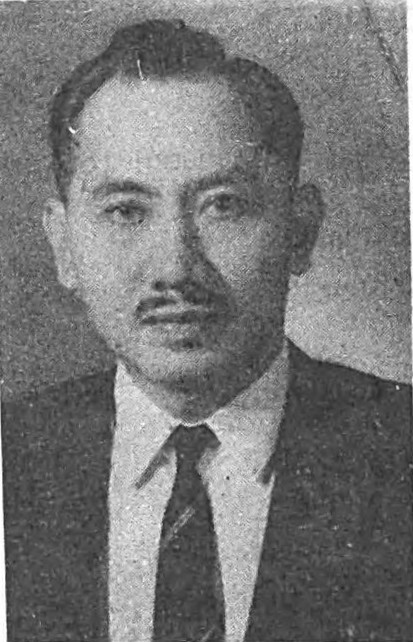
- Ranawidjaja, c. 1971

Ambassador of Indonesia to Vietnam
- In office 21 February 1973 – 1976
- Preceded by: Nugroho
- Succeeded by: Hardi

Member of the House of Representatives
- In office 1976–1981
- In office 24 August 1964 – 9 December 1972

Personal details
- Born: 9 May 1924 Bandung, Dutch East Indies
- Died: 5 February 2010 (aged 85) Jakarta, Indonesia
- Party: PNI-Marhaenism; Indonesian Democratic Party; Indonesian National Party

Usep Ranawidjaja (Note: EYD: Usep Ranawijaya. Also spelled Ranuwidjaja or Ranuwijaya) (9 May 1924 – 5 February 2010) was an Indonesian politician and legal scholar. He was a member of the House of Representatives, initially from the Indonesian National Party from 1964 to 1972 and later the Indonesian Democratic Party from 1976 to 1981. He was also Ambassador of Indonesia to Vietnam from 1972 to 1976.

A student of Ernest Douwes Dekker and a Gadjah Mada University law graduate, Ranawidjaja entered government service in 1953 and joined the Indonesian National Party. He was secretary–general at the Constitutional Assembly of Indonesia before he was appointed to the House of Representatives in 1964. After the 30 September movement of 1965, he joined Osa Maliki's splinter faction of the party as secretary-general, and later briefly chaired the newly formed Indonesian Democratic Party between 1975 and 1976.

== Early life ==
Usep Ranawidjaja was born in Bandung on 9 May 1924. During middle school, he was taught by Ernest Douwes Dekker, a key Indo politician and Indonesian nationalist who introduced him to other nationalists, including future president Sukarno. During the Japanese occupation of Indonesia, he was active in a number of youth movements before joining a student's corps in 1946 during the Indonesian National Revolution.

== Career ==
=== In government ===
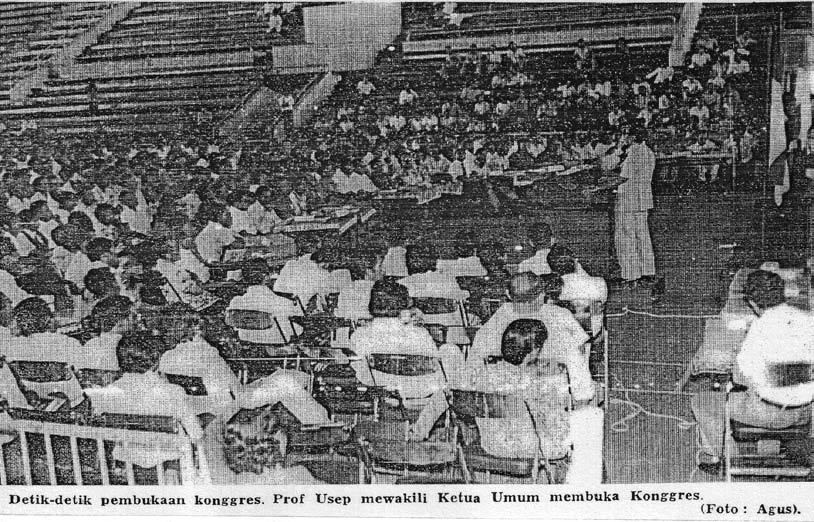
Ranawidjaja opening PDI's first congress in 1976.

After the revolution, Ranawidjaja received a law degree from Gadjah Mada University in 1953. That year, he joined the Indonesian National Party (PNI), and became a civil servant at the Ministry of Home Affairs. He worked there until 1957, when he joined the Constitutional Assembly of Indonesia as secretary-general in July that year. He served in this post until the assembly was disbanded by Sukarno in 1959. Aside from these offices, he also served for a time at the Jakarta City Council where he was appointed to replace a resigning PNI member on 1 October 1955.

In 1963, Ranawidjaja became chairman of the National Cultural Body (Indonesian: Lembaga Kebudayaan Nasional), and related to this position he was appointed to the House of Representatives by a Presidential Decree on 24 August 1964. The following year, he would be appointed as secretary-general at a splinter PNI faction formed by Osa Maliki in the aftermath of the 30 September movement. The splinter faction would later be known as the "Osa-Usep PNI", and received backing from officers in the Indonesian Army. He retained his position as secretary-general until 1970, and his seat at the House after the 1971 election, representing Ciamis Regency in West Java as a PNI member.

On 9 December 1972, Ranawidjaja was appointed Indonesia's Ambassador to North Vietnam (based in Hanoi). Being a civilian, Ranawidjaja was unusual in the early Suharto period where most ambassadors were military officers. He presented his credentials on 21 February 1973.

PNI was merged with several other nationalist and Christian parties into the Indonesian Democratic Party in 1973, and Ranawidjaja was appointed as the party's chairman on 19 February 1975 to replace Sunawar Sukowati who had been appointed as a government minister. Ranawidjaja chaired the party until the election of Sanusi Hardjadinata at PDI's inaugural congress in April 1976. He was politically active until 1981, when he was recalled by the party from the House.

=== Academic and later career ===
In 1960, Ranawidjaja founded the law faculty at 17 August 1945 University Jakarta, where he would serve as law professor. He also served as dean of the law faculty at Padjadjaran University between 1965 and 1966, lecturing there since 1964. He was further a lecturer at the Indonesian Air Force's Command and Staff College between 1960 and 1963.

After the fall of Suharto, Ranawidjaja called for amendments to the Constitution of Indonesia. In a 1999 interview with Tempo, he noted that the original constitution was "a simple one applicable for the revolutionary era". He also ran as a candidate of Indonesian National Party Marhaenism in the 2004 election for the House.

== Personal life ==
Ranawidjaja was married to Ati Andromeda, and the couple had six children along with ten grandchildren at the time of Ranawidjaja's death.

On the evening of 5 February 2010, Ranawidjaja in his car ran into a highway barrier in Bintaro in South Jakarta. He received intensive treatment at a nearby hospital, but died at around 10 PM that day. He was buried the following day at the Tanah Kusir Public Cemetery.
