= Indonesian National Party – Marhaenist Front =

Indonesian National Party – Marhaenist Front Partai Nasional Indonesia – Front Marhaenis
- Abbreviation: PNI-FM
- Chairperson: Probosutedjo
- Secretary-General: Bambang Suroso
- Founded: 10 February 1999
- Dissolved: 2004
- Preceded by: PNI
- Headquarters: Jl. Cikini Raya No 48 Jakarta Pusat
- Ideology: Pancasila; Marhaenism; Indonesian nationalism Sukarnoism
- Political position: Left-wing

The Indonesian National Party – Marhaenist Front (Indonesian: Partai Nasional Indonesia – Front Marhaenis, PNI-FM)) was one of several political parties vying to inherit the legacy of the original PNI, along with Indonesian National Party – Marhaen Masses (PNI-MM) and PNI Supeni. Established in Jakarta on 10 February 1999, PNI-FM was one of the participants of the 1999 legislative election. However, similar to many other parties that participated in the election, PNI-FM failed to qualify for the 2004 legislative election and was subsequently disbanded in the same year.

== Election result ==
=== Legislative election results ===
Election	Ballot number	Leader	Seats		Total votes	Share of votes	Outcome of election
Election	Ballot number	Leader	No.	±	Total votes	Share of votes	Outcome of election
1999	26	Probosutedjo	1 / 462		365,176	0.35%	Opposition
