= Ali Sastroamidjojo =

Indonesian statesman and diplomat (1903–1975)

Raden Ali Sastroamidjojo
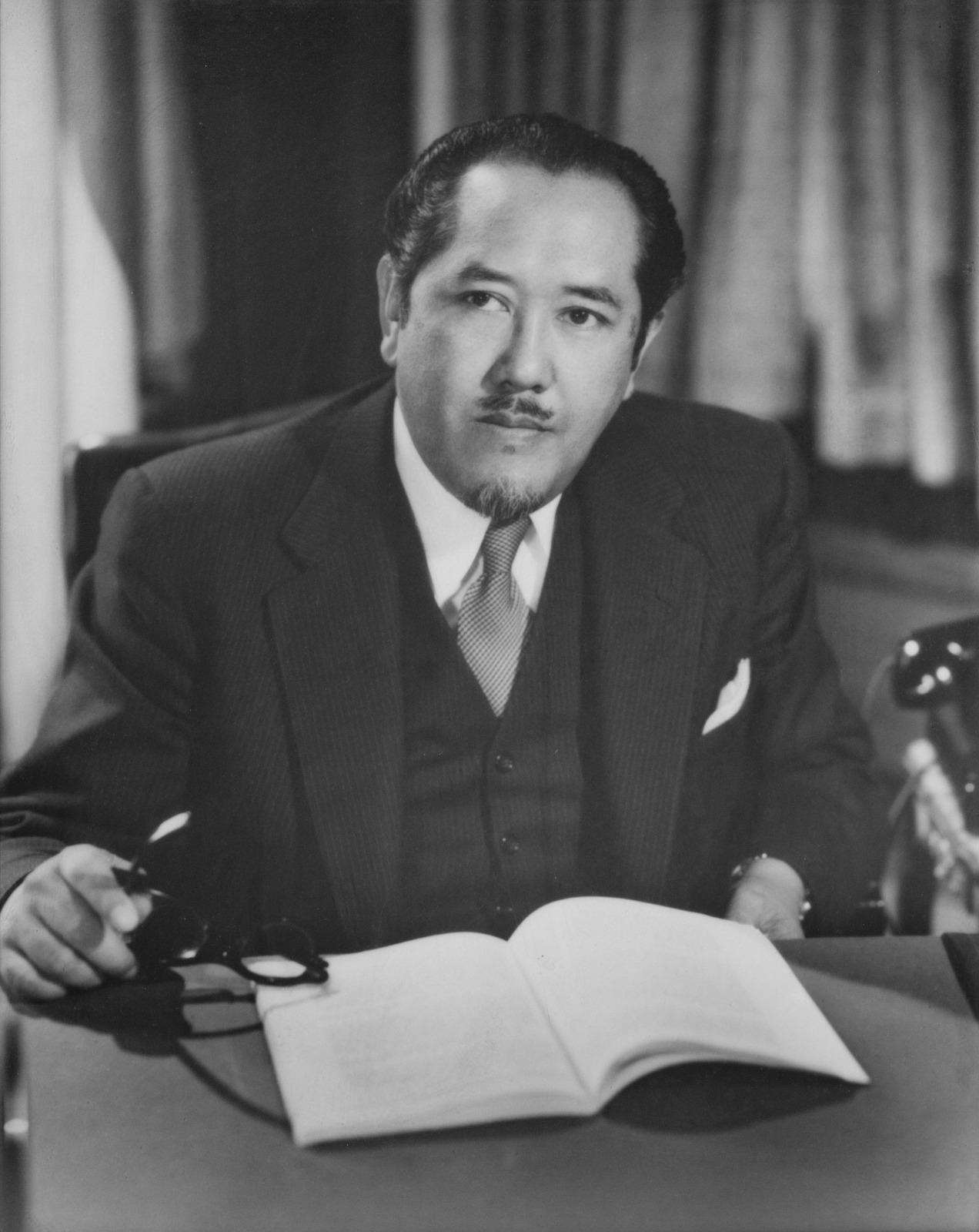
- Official portrait, 1950

Chairman of the Indonesian National Party
- In office 29 July 1960 – 27 April 1966
- Preceded by: Suwiryo
- Succeeded by: Osa Maliki

8th and 10th Prime Minister of Indonesia
- In office 24 March 1956 – 9 April 1957
- President: Sukarno
- Deputy: Mohammad Roem; Idham Chalid
- Preceded by: Burhanuddin Harahap
- Succeeded by: Djuanda Kartawidjaja
- In office 30 July 1953 – 12 August 1955
- President: Sukarno
- Deputy: Wongsonegoro; Zainul Arifin
- Preceded by: Wilopo
- Succeeded by: Burhanuddin Harahap
Ministerial offices
9th Minister of Defense
In office 24 March 1956 – 9 April 1957
President	Sukarno
Prime Minister	Himself
Preceded by	Burhanuddin Harahap
Succeeded by	Djuanda Kartawidjaja
5th Minister of Education and Culture
In office 3 July 1947 – 4 August 1949
President	Sukarno
Prime Minister	Amir Sjarifuddin; Mohammad Hatta
Preceded by	Soewandi
Succeeded by	Ki Sarmidi Mangunsarkoro
1st Deputy Minister of Information
In office 19 August 1945 – 14 November 1945
President	Sukarno
Preceded by	Office established
Succeeded by	Abdurrahman Baswedan
Diplomatic offices
3rd Permanent Representative of Indonesia to the United Nations
In office 1957–1960
Preceded by	Sudjarwo Tjondronegoro
Succeeded by	Soekardjo Wirjopranoto
1st Ambassador of Indonesia to Canada
In office 1953–1954
Preceded by	Office established
Succeeded by	Usman Sastroamidjojo
1st Ambassador of Indonesia to the United States
In office 20 February 1950 – 27 February 1953
Preceded by	Office established
Succeeded by	Moekarto Notowidigdo

Personal details
- Born: 21 May 1903 Grabag, Kedoe Residency, Dutch East Indies
- Died: 13 March 1975 (aged 71) Jakarta, Indonesia
- Resting place: Kalibata Heroes' Cemetery
- Party: PNI
- Other political affiliations: Partindo; Gerindo
- Spouses: Titi Roelia (m. 1922; died 1966); Kurnianingrat (m. 1970)
- Relatives: Ali Wardhana (nephew)
- Education: Leiden University (Mr.)
- Occupation: Politician; diplomat
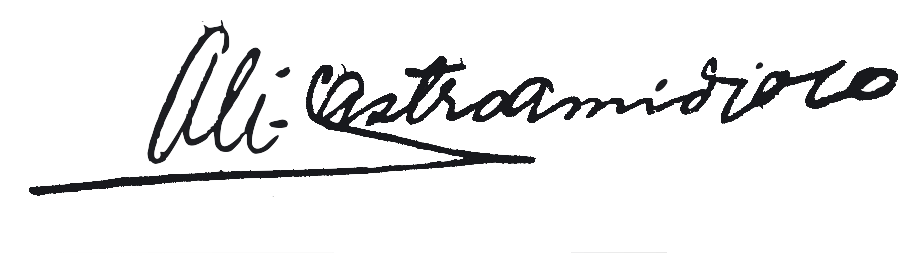
- Signature

Ali Sastroamidjojo (EYD: Ali Sastroamijoyo; 21 May 1903 – 13 March 1975) was an Indonesian politician and diplomat. He served in various political and diplomatic roles during the presidency of Sukarno, most notably as a cabinet minister, prime minister, chairman of the Indonesian National Party (PNI), and permanent representative to the United Nations. Ali was born in Grabag, Purworejo, Dutch East Indies (now Indonesia), to an aristocratic family from Magelang and studied at Leiden University. During his studies, he was active in several youth organizations, including the Jong Java and the Perhimpoenan Indonesia associations. He was briefly arrested by the Dutch in 1927 but was released shortly thereafter.

In 1928, he began practicing as a lawyer and began publishing the Djanget magazine in Surakarta. During this time, he became involved in the struggle for independence, joining the Indonesian Nationalist Party (PNI). However, when the PNI was dissolved by Dutch authorities, he moved to Gerindo (Indonesian People's Movement). Following the proclamation of Indonesian Independence in 1945, he continued his activities in politics and government, becoming deputy minister of education in the first Indonesian cabinet. He would go on to serve as Minister of Education in the Amir Syarifuddin Cabinet and the Hatta Cabinet. He then served as deputy chairman of the delegation of the Republic of Indonesia in negotiations with the Netherlands and became a member of the delegation of the Republic of Indonesia in the negotiations of the Round Table Conference.

On 1 August 1953, Ali became Prime Minister of Indonesia, leading the First Ali Sastroamidjojo Cabinet. After the cabinet fell in 1955, Ali Sastroamidjojo again became Prime Minister of Indonesia for the second time on March 26, 1956. He again led his cabinet, though it lasted less than a year. He was also a key figure in the negotiations of the Sino-Indonesian Dual Nationality Treaty. After the recognition of the sovereignty of the Republic of Indonesia, he was appointed the first Indonesian Ambassador to the United States, Canada, and Mexico, from 1950 until 1955. In addition, he was also appointed chairman of the Asian-African Conference in Bandung. In July 1960, at the ninth annual congress of the PNI, Sastroamidjojo was elected party chairman. In 1967, following the fall of Sukarno, Sastroamidjojo was arrested but later released without having been tried. He died in Jakarta, on 13 March 1975, he is buried at the Kalibata Heroes' Cemetery.

== Early life and education ==
Raden Ali Sastroamidjojo was born in Grabag, Central Java, Dutch East Indies (now Indonesia). He came from an aristocratic family of the Magelang Regency, belonging to the Indonesian elite. He was the 11th child of 12 children. His father was R. Ng. Sastroamidjojo, who was a Wedana in Jetis, Temanggung, while his mother was named Kustiah, who was a relative of the Regent of Magelang. Both of his parents were persistent in defending Javanese customs. He spent his childhood years in the local town, playing with his friends from peasant families. In hoping to find a proper environment for the development of their children, the Sastroamidjojo family moved to the city, where he was sent to receive a European education. Though he also regularly studied the Javanese language.

The Sastroamidjojo family was devoted to advocating the importance of Western education. He officially began his education when he took Dutch lessons to be accepted in the second class of the Europeesche Lagere School (ELS), but he only lasted a year there due to bullying. His father then transferred Ali to another class, but was rejected, because he couldn't speak Dutch very well. He was eventually accepted after some convincing by his father. In 1918, he continued his education at the Hogere Burgerschool (HBS). There, he became acquainted with Western culture, especially Dutch culture. During this time, he also studied French, German, and English literature. Including writers such as Bernard Shaw, William Shakespeare, and Willem Kloos. In 1922, Ali completed his education at HBS, and after graduating, he met Titi Roelia who would later become his wife.

Like several other young men of nobility in the Dutch East Indies, Ali managed to obtain a scholarship to study in the Netherlands, due in part to help from Hendriks Kraemer, a Bachelor of Eastern Literature and Eastern Culture and an acquaintance of his older brother. While in the Netherlands, he lived in Leiden to enter the Faculty of Letters and Philosophy of the University of Leiden but was rejected because his HBS diploma did not meet the requirements. He was advised to study again, but only obtained a diploma in Latin and Greek literature, before switching to studying Law. He graduated with a Meester in de Rechten (Bachelor of Law) degree in 1927. During his time there, he was active in several youth organizations, including the Jong Java and the Perhimpoenan Indonesia associations. Because of his activities, he was arrested by the Dutch in 1927 but was released shortly thereafter.

== Struggle for independence ==
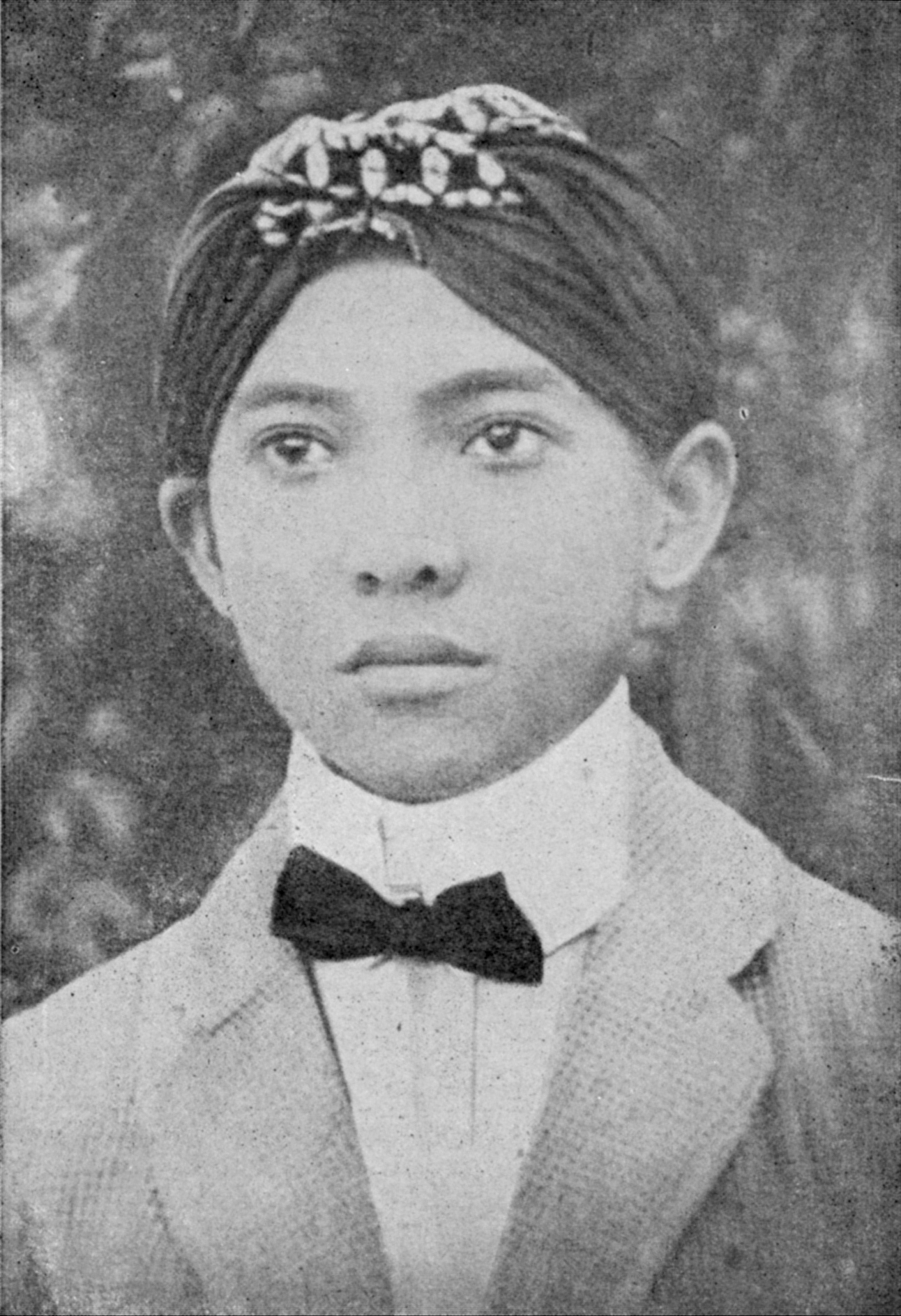
Sukarno, the founder of the Indonesian National Party (PNI), as a student, c. 1916

Ali returned to the Dutch East Indies in 1928, and he opened a lawyer's office. He also published the Djanget magazine in Surakarta, together with fellow future prime minister Soekiman Wirjosandjojo. However, he left his job to join Sukarno's Indonesian National Party (PNI). The PNI would eventually become a revolutionary organization, with Ali becoming a member of the Yogyakarta Branch of the PNI. Around this time, his wife, Titi Roelia, became an activist in the independence and feminist movement. He and Sukarno feuded over the issue of clothing within the PNI organization, with Sukarno wanting all members to wear uniform clothing, while Ali wanted members to wear sarungs. Despite some differences, both men remained as good friends.

In 1929, Sukarno and other key PNI leaders were arrested on 29 December, by Dutch colonial authorities in a series of raids throughout Java. This resulted in the dissolution of the PNI. However, several other new nationalist organizations popped up from the remnants of the PNI, mostly consisting of former PNI members. Ali joined one of these new organizations, which was then known as Partindo, which translates to "Indonesia Party." He also briefly joined the Indonesian People's Movement (Gerindo) following the fall of the PNI.

== Political career ==
=== Cabinet minister ===
After World War II ended, he continued his activities in politics and government, becoming deputy minister of education in the first Indonesian cabinet. He would go on to serve as Minister of Education in the Amir Syarifuddin Cabinet and the Hatta Cabinet. He then served as deputy chairman of the delegation of the Republic of Indonesia in negotiations with the Netherlands and became a member of the delegation of the Republic of Indonesia in the negotiations of the Round Table Conference.

=== Prime ministership ===
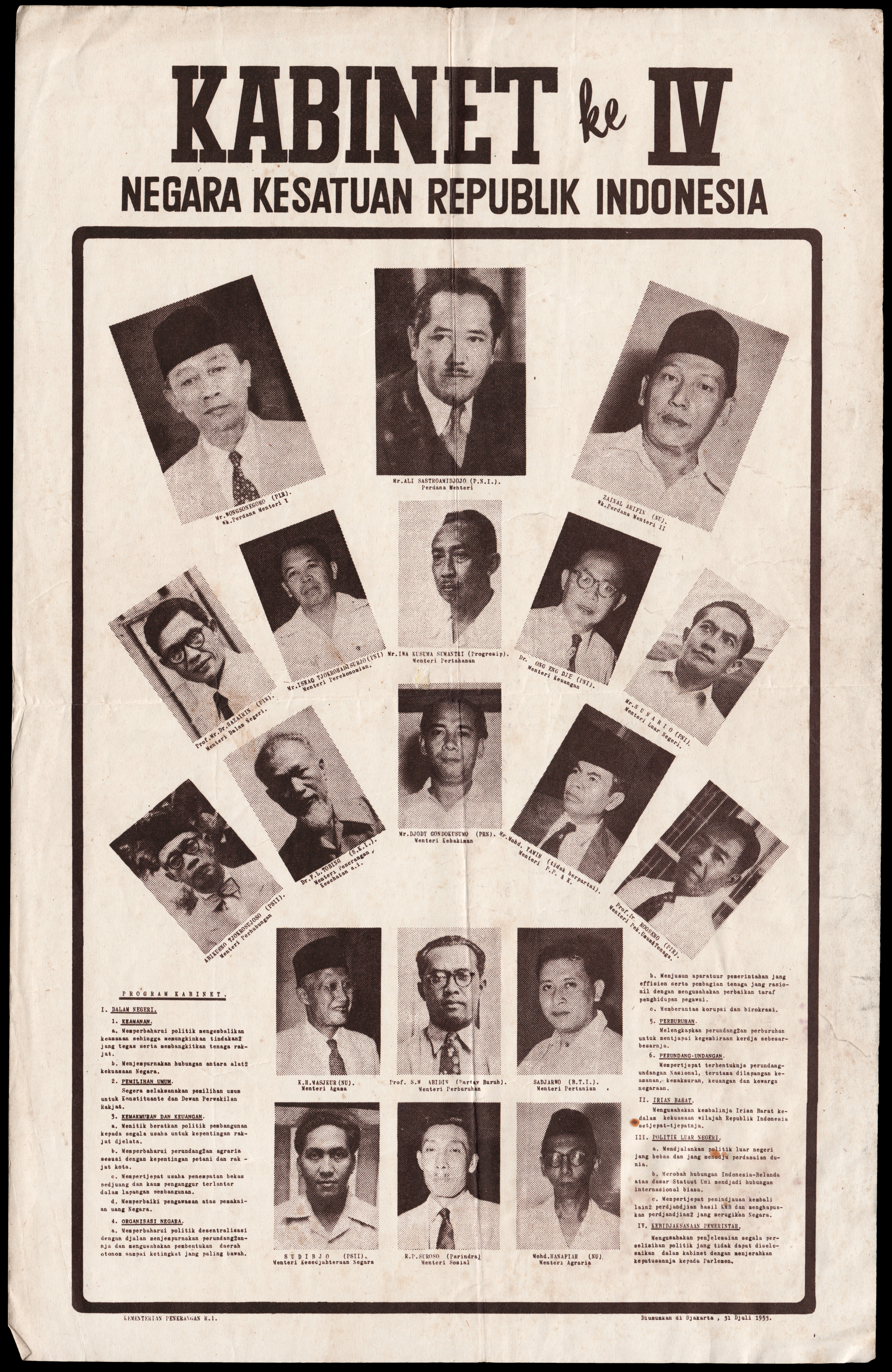
Poster showing the First Ali Sastroamidjojo Cabinet

After the Wilopo Cabinet's fall, following the killing of five peasants near Medan while removing squatters from foreign-owned estate lands, in what became known as the “Tanjung Morawa affair,” Ali was chosen to lead the new cabinet, which was formed after over six weeks of bargaining and five different attempts at various party combinations. The cabinet was different from the previous cabinet, as its members were overwhelmingly new, with only four of its twenty members having participated in any of the preceding four cabinets.

On 25 August 1953, the new prime minister, Ali Sastroamidjojo, announced a 16-month schedule for elections starting from January 1954. On 4 November 1953, Ali Sastroamidjojo and his cabinet announced the creation of the new Central Electoral Committee ("Panitia Pemilihan Indonesia"), the forerunner to the General Elections Commission. The Committee was to replace the previous cabinet's short-lived Assaat committee. The committee included all of the parties represented in the government, which included the Nahdatul Ulama (NU), the Indonesian Islamic Union Party (PSII), the Indonesian People's Party (PRI), the National People's Party (PRN), the Labor Party, and the Peasants Front of Indonesia (BTI), as well as the government-supporting Islamic Education Movement (Perti) and the Indonesian Christian Party (Parkindo).

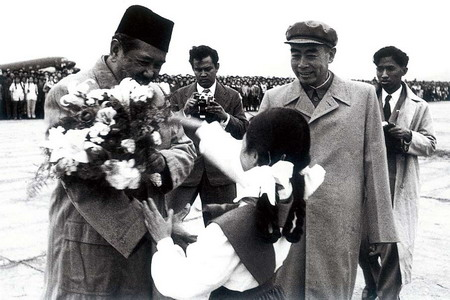
Ali Sastroamidjojo is greeted by Zhou Enlai upon his arrival in Beijing, 26 May 1955.

Under the cabinet, the bureaucracy was expanded with more PNI officials, and the economy was under a period of Indonesianization, with the government encouraging indigenous businessmen to open new firms. In practice, however, many new firms were bogus fronts for arrangements between government supporters and Chinese, which became known as "Ali Baba firms," in which an Indonesian (‘Ali’) was front man for a Chinese (‘Baba’) entrepreneur.

After the recognition of the sovereignty of the Republic of Indonesia, he was appointed the first Indonesian Ambassador to the United States, Canada, and Mexico, from 1950 until 1955. In addition, he was also appointed chairman of the Asian-African Conference in Bandung. In July 1960, at the ninth annual congress of the PNI, Sastroamidjojo was elected party chairman.

=== PNI chairman ===
The Indonesian National Party (PNI), of which Ali was a part, had failed to confront Indonesia's political problems coherently. During the years of Suwiryo's leadership, chaos pervaded the party's provincial organization. This resulted in a growing challenge from the young and left-wing camp, which eventually formed Partindo, a new left-wing party. Though the party didn't gain mass support, it reflected the wide criticisms against the PNI under Suwiryo's leadership. In the 9th PNI Congress, held in Surakarta, Central Java, in July 1960, Ali was chosen to head the party, replacing the ineffective Suwiryo. As head of the PNI, Ali was described as "a consummate politician imbued with a healthy sense of self-preservation", but often disappointed his supporters from the young and left-wing camp by often positioning himself in the middle.

Under his leadership, the PNI carried out organizational reforms to restore the authority of the central leadership, with increased coordination of party activities with mass organizations. These reforms resulted in the increasing membership of the party, with only 198,554 names being registered in April 1961, and rising dramatically to 1,858,119 names by the time of the 10th Party Congress. A new rule was later issued in 1961, which regulated party-organizational relations, and specifies that the party is the "vanguard organization" in the Marhaen movement, and the party leadership serves as the "guide" of the mass organizations affiliated with it. After the 10th PNI Congress in Purwokerto, Ali Sastroamidjojo was re-elected as general chairman, with a new figure known as Surachman, a young figure who was previously active in the Peasants and farmers wing of the party, was elected general secretary. Ali also moved the party further to the left.

This was seen in his speech to commemorate the 36th PNI Anniversary, which took place on 7 July 1963, at the Gelora Bung Karno Stadium, then known as the Senayan main stadium, where Ali adhered to Sukarno's limits, saying "…The doctrine (Marhaenism) and the program of struggle based on scientific socialism are further based on Marxist socialism, for it was only after Marx that scientific socialism was developed." The working committee of the PNI Congress also agreed that Marhaenism is a form of Marxism "which is applied by the conditions and situation of Indonesia." The PNI also reiterated its ideals as a party for the marhaens to fight imperialism, neo-colonialism, and capitalism.

However, the issue of division began to take root within the PNI, between the more left-wing camp under Ali and Surachman and the camp of the conservatives under Osa Maliki, Sabilal Rasjad, Hardi, Hadisubeno Sosrowerdojo and Mohammad Isnaeni. Following the failed 30 September Movement coup, led by the Communist Party of Indonesia (PKI), the political winds began to shift. The division between the left-wing camp and the conservative camp, which had continued to deepen, reached a breaking point. At the extraordinary congress in Bandung, from 21 to 27 April 1966, the left-wing Ali and Surachman camp was overthrown by the conservative camp, with Osa Maliki being elected chairman. It was said that General Ali Moertopo was directly involved in the Congress to purge the left wing from the PNI.

== Death and legacy ==
Following his dethronement from the position of chairman of the PNI, Ali remained as a committed nationalist, Marhaenist, and follower of Sukarno. After Sukarno's ousting in 1967, by General Suharto, who became president shortly thereafter, Ali was arrested by the military, in a general roundup of Sukarno's former associates. He would be released and never brought to trial. He would spend the rest of his life in relative peace, using this time to write. He died in Jakarta, on 13 March 1975, his body is interred at the Kalibata Heroes' Cemetery.

He is the uncle of Finance Minister Ali Wardhana. Ali Sastroamidjojo has been called 'the greatest statesman' of Indonesia and it was said of him that 'the current statesmen of Indonesia will never be as great as Sastroamidjojo in his role as the prime minister who also had great literary talent'. The current Embassy of Indonesia in Washington, D.C., was purchased by Ali Sastroamidjojo on 19 December 1951 for $335,000.

== Publications ==
In addition to being a political figure, he was also a noted author having published several books and publications in the field of international relations and foreign policy, including :

- Introduction to International Law (1971)
- Indonesian Foreign Policy (1972)
- An autobiographical book of his journey and milestones (1974)
- Four Indonesian students in the Netherlands (1975).

Political offices
Preceded by Wilopo	Prime Minister of Indonesia; 30 July 1953 – 12 August 1955	Succeeded by Burhanuddin Harahap
Preceded by Burhanuddin Harahap	Prime Minister of Indonesia; 24 March 1956 – 9 April 1957	Succeeded by Djuanda Kartawidjaja
