= Osa Maliki =

Indonesian politician (1907–1969)

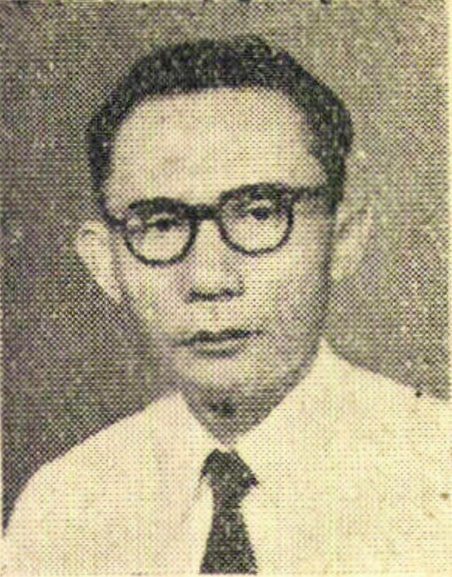
- Official portrait, 1956

Chairman of the Indonesian National Party
- In office 27 April 1966 – 15 September 1969
- Preceded by: Ali Sastroamidjojo
- Succeeded by: Hardi (acting)
Legislative offices
Deputy Speaker of the People's Consultative Assembly
In office
20 June 1966 – 15 September 1969
Member of the House of Representatives
In office
24 March 1956 – 9 February 1968

Personal details
- Born: 30 December 1907 Padalarang, Preanger, Dutch East Indies (present-day West Java, Indonesia)
- Died: 15 September 1969 (aged 61) Semarang, Central Java, Indonesia
- Resting place: Cikutra Heroes Cemetery
- Party: Indonesian National Party (1946–1965; 1966–1969); Indonesian Communist Party (1924–1927)

Osa Maliki Wangsadinata (30 December 1907 – 15 September 1969) was an Indonesian politician who was chairman of the Indonesian National Party (PNI) and a deputy speaker of the People's Consultative Assembly (MPR) from 1966 until his death.

Born in Padalarang, Osa was educated at a Taman Siswa school. In 1926, he took part in a communist rebellion against the colonial government. The failure of the rebellion led to his exile to the Boven-Digoel concentration camp. After returning from exile in 1938, Osa worked as a teacher. A few years later, during the Japanese occupation, he worked in the propaganda section of a Hōkōkai and became a member of the Suishintai. However, he was briefly detained by the Kenpeitai over his connections to an underground resistance movement.

Following the proclamation of Indonesian Independence in 1945, Osa joined the newly-formed Republican government where he served in various positions. He also co-founded a new political party, Serindo, which later became the PNI. During the Indonesian National Revolution, Osa was imprisoned by the Dutch shortly after Operation Product in 1947. However, he was released a year later following the signing of the Renville Agreement. Osa remained politically active after the end of the revolution, being elected to the House of Representatives in the 1955 elections.

In the early 1960s, the PNI suffered from internal disputes as right-wing and left-wing factions developed within the party, with party chairman Ali Sastroamidjojo belonging the latter group. Osa became leader of the right-wing faction and was suspended from the PNI by Ali. Nevertheless, following the turmoil of the mid-1960s, Osa—with the support of major general Suharto—successfully ousted Ali and became party chairman in 1966. He was also appointed a deputy speaker of the MPR that same year. As chairman, Osa attempted to reform the PNI, but his efforts were cut short by his own death. Following his death, the PNI would be forcefully merged into the Indonesian Democratic Party by the New Order regime in 1973.

== Early life and career ==
Osa Maliki Wangsadinata was born on 30 December 1907, in Padalarang, in what is today West Bandung. Little is known of his early life; he was educated in a Taman Siswa school. In 1924, he joined the Red Indonesian Youth Organization and later the Red Sarekat Islam. Becoming a member of the Communist Party of Indonesia (PKI), he participated in the unsuccessful 1926 communist rebellion. In the aftermath, Osa was captured and sentenced to jail for 4 years and two months, before being exiled to the Boven-Digoel concentration camp by Dutch authorities.

During his time in Boven-Digoel, Osa became a member of the Rust en Orde Bewaarder (ROB), a security force which protected the streets and villages of the area. In the ROB, he earned a salary of 17.5 Gulden. As a member of the ROB, he once dealt with the commotion between Digoel's political prisoners, some of whom used pocket knives. He returned from his exile in 1938, and began teaching at a Taman Siswa school in Bandung. A position he held from 1938 until the Japanese invasion in 1942. During the Japanese occupation of the Dutch East Indies, he became head of propaganda at Jawa Hokokai. He also became a member of the Special Pioneers Front, the youth wing of Jawa Hokokai founded by future-president Sukarno. However, he was also detained by the Japanese military police (Kempeitai) for four months in Bandung.

== Early political career ==
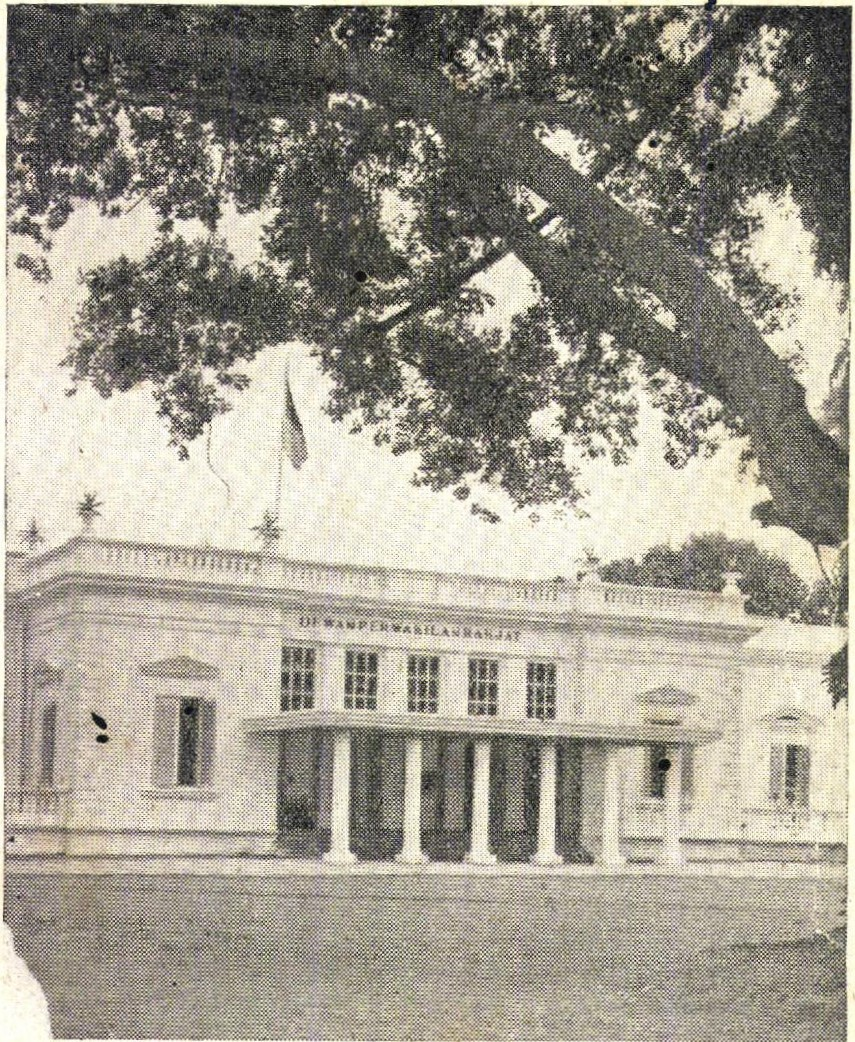
The original People's Representative Council building, where Osa served as a legislator

Following the proclamation of independence and the beginning of the Indonesian National Revolution, he served in the newly formed provincial government of the province of West Java. In December 1945, he became a member of Indonesian People's Union (Serindo), and after the Kediri Congress in 1946, he joined the Indonesian National Party (PNI). After the end of the national revolution and the beginning of an independent Indonesian state, he studied mass communication in Europe and the United States. In the 1955 Indonesian legislative elections, he was elected to the People's Representative Council representing the province of West Java.

During the tenth Congress of the PNI, which took place in the town of Purwokerto, Central Java, from 28 August and 1 September 1963, a power struggle between the more left-wing faction of the PNI, led by its chairman Ali Sastroamidjojo, and the more right-wing faction, led by Hardi, occurred. Through a number of factors, including the skillful manipulation of the congress schedule, and the support of President Sukarno, Ali was re-elected chairman through acclamation. Following the election of the chairman, the election for the five deputy chairmen of the party was mostly a matter of allocating them among the two competing factions while also maintaining a semblance of geographic representation. This resulted in Osa being appointed a deputy chairman, along with Hardi, Mohamad Isa, Ruslan Abdulgani, and I Gusti Gde Subamia.

== Political infighting ==
=== Suspension from the PNI ===
The defeat of the right-wing Hardi faction in 1963 PNI Congress, led to their growing isolation in the subsequent years, with the left-wing continuing to gradually increase the number of their supporters in both the national and local party councils. The right-wing faction also considered the left's "ambivalent position" towards the PKI, as a "betrayal", and as the beginning of a purge of the party leadership of right-wing elements. On 25 July 1965, in the 38th anniversary of the PNI, President Sukarno gave a speech; he chided party leaders such as Ali for not having started a purge. In the weeks after the speech, many in the left issued resolutions demanding the expelling of Hadisubeno Sosrowerdojo, Mohammad Isnaeni, and Hardi.

In response, party leaders decided to include the issue on the agenda for the already-scheduled meeting of the Central Leadership Council on 4 August 1965. However, six members did not attend the meeting, including Hardi, Mohammad Isnaeni, and Osa. Instead, the day before the meeting, they drafted a letter, which was delivered to all Central Leadership Council members, explaining that their refusal was based on their belief that nothing would be achieved, due to the existing tension in the party. As a result, they were all suspended by Chairman Ali from the PNI. This group, consisting of seven members, along with three other suspended PNI members, proceeded to attempt to generate support to call an extraordinary PNI congress. Between May and October 1965, 140 members were suspended by PNI for supporting Osa's faction, mostly from Jakarta and West Java.

=== Takeover of the leadership ===
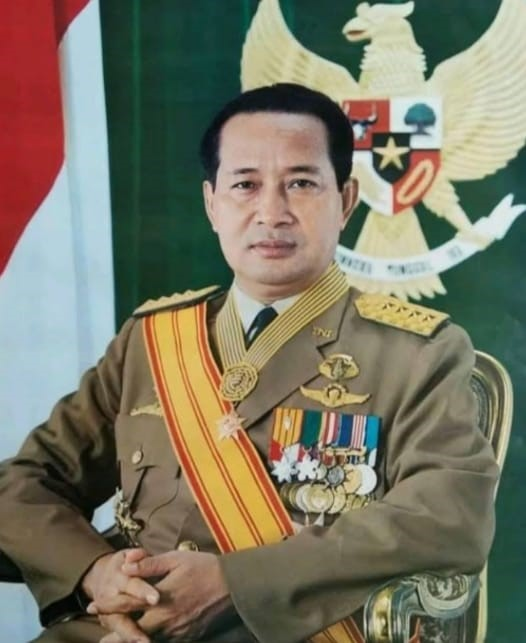
Major General Suharto, c. 1968

Following the alleged attempted communist coup of the 30 September movement, both the PKI and President Sukarno had been severely weakened. This gave an opening to the more right-wing faction of the PNI, now led by Osa, which began acting more boldly. In early October, Osa's faction set up a competing leadership of the PNI, with Osa himself as chairman. This new leadership declared that the previous leadership under Ali was banned from the party. By mid-October, army commanders and religious groups had backed and cooperated with Osa's faction in eliminating supposed pro-PKI elements from PNI. While other PNI members such as Iskaq Tjokrohadisurjo, attempted to bring Ali's and Osa's factions together by arranging an emergency party congress with little success.

In March 1966, Sukarno had been forced to yield virtually all his political power, which gave major general Suharto significant authority. Subsequently, Suharto arranged meetings between the opposing PNI factions in the same month. In the third meeting, on 24 March, Suharto extracted a joint statement from the Osa and Ali factions, in which both groups declared their agreement to hold an extraordinary congress. However, the Ali faction had not agreed to such demands while declaring its intention to hold the eleventh party congress ahead of schedule. Despite this, the extraordinary congress went ahead on 24–27 April 1966, with significant interference from the military. The delegation from the Ali faction were heckled, and Iskaq (who became the chairman of the extraordinary congress) had almost lost control of the situation.

Between sessions, private negotiations were held between both sides. Osa's faction demanded the resignation of Ali, and transfer of leadership to Osa and Usep Ranawidjaja. Ali responded with the proposal that all PNI leadership council members elected the Purwokerto Congress should be ineligible to stand again for leadership positions. Ali's proposal would have excluded himself from running again, but would have also excluded Osa, Isnaeni, and Hardi, resulting in the Osa faction flatly rejecting the proposal. Eventually, both groups agreed to the appointment of Osa as General Chairman with full authority to choose a new central leadership council, with the assistance of S. Hadikusumo, a supporter of Ali. The new agreement was approved by a plenary session, and resulted in the takeover the PNI by the Osa faction, and sidelining of the Ali faction.

== Later political career ==
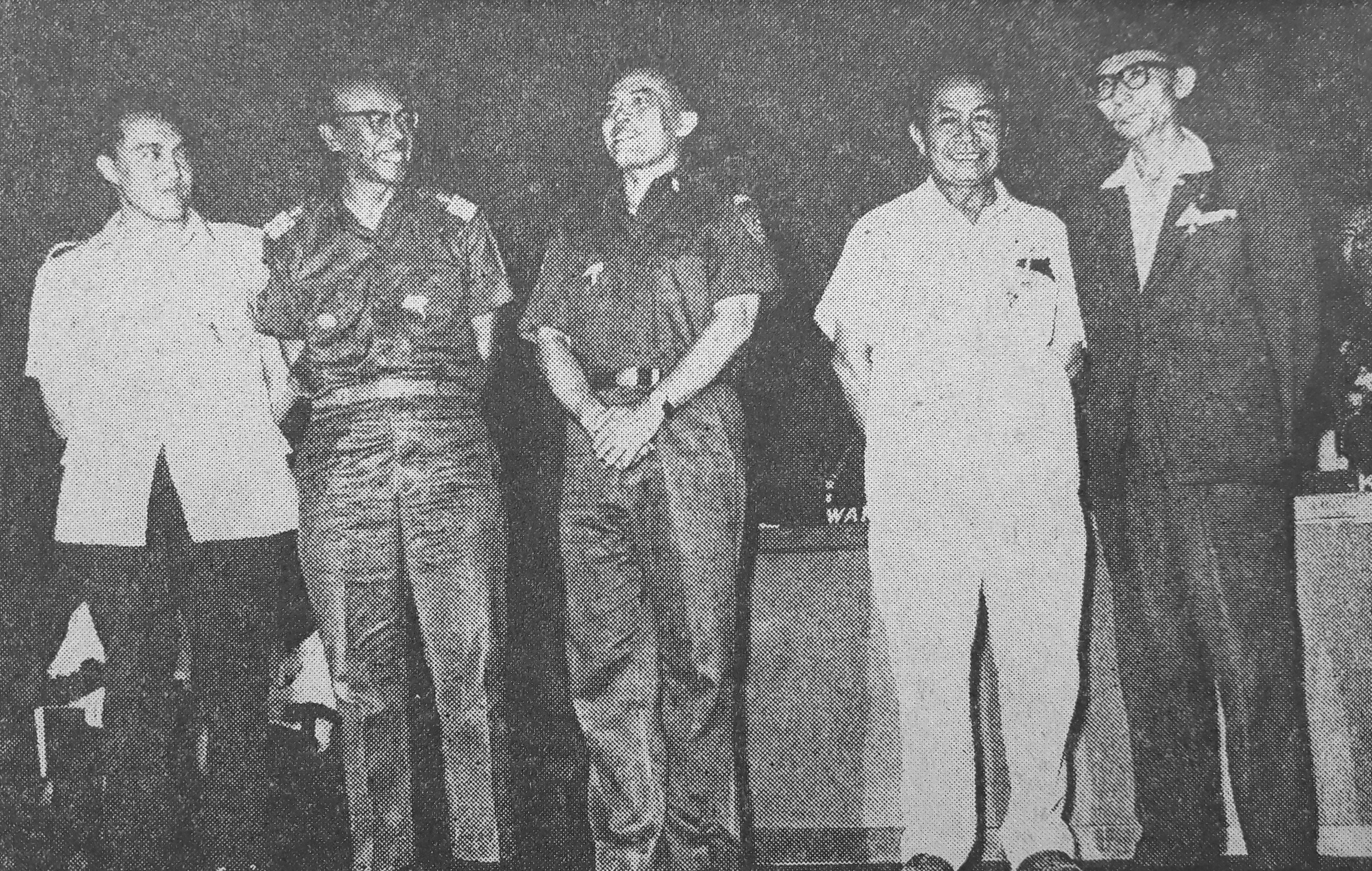
The leadership of the Provisional People's Consultative Assembly in 1967, with Osa in the far-right

During the 1966 general session of the Provisional People's Consultative Assembly (MPRS), the MPRS unanimously elected General Abdul Haris Nasution as speaker. In turn, Nasution appointed Osa as a Deputy Speaker, alongside, Mashudi, Mohammad Subchan, and Melanchton Siregar. Despite the end of the split, and the election of a new right-wing leadership for the PNI, the party's existence remained in question. As despite support from Suharto, Osa's PNI were still seen as too close to the "old older" in the eyes of Muslim students, the anti-communist KAMI, and the New Order militants. This was because of Osa's (and the party as a whole) reluctance to attack Sukarno.

Demands for the banning of the PNI arose, with territorial commanders (who were New Order militants) beginning to "freeze" local branches of the PNI. And by 1967, the entirety of the PNI organization in Sumatra had been "frozen". However, despite these challenges, the PNI was able to survive, as in December 1967, Suharto ordered local military commanders to aid the PNI in reforming itself. Suharto's actions were based on his view of the PNI, which he saw as a natural vehicle for the expression of the political aspirations of the non-Islamic masses of Java and as an important counter-balance towards the Muslim parties, such as Parmusi, and the Nahdlatul Ulama.

== Death and funeral ==
On the night of 14 September 1969, Osa was invited to give a speech at the opening of the 5th Indonesian National Student Movement congress in Salatiga, Central Java. While giving the speech, he experienced a heart attack, and he was rushed to Salatiga Hospital. His condition slightly improved, before he was then transferred to Dr. Kariadi Central General Hospital in Semarang. There, he remained in care until he died, at around 3:00 p.m. Western Indonesian Time on 15 September. His body was interred in Cikutra Heroes Cemetery in Bandung.
