= Hardi (politician) =

Indonesian politician (1918–1998)

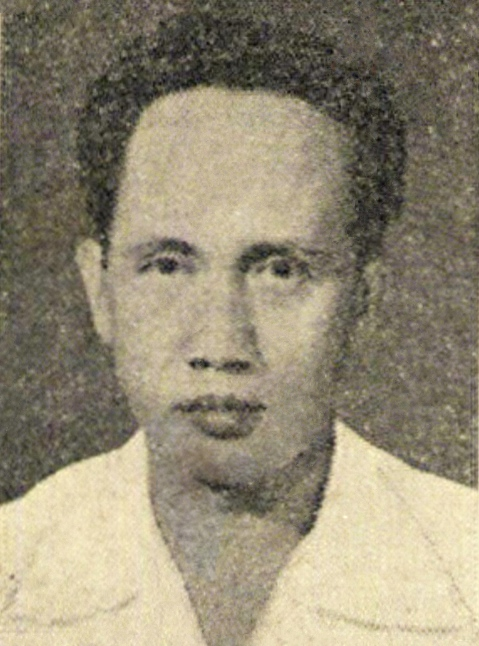
- Official portrait, c. 1956

Indonesian Ambassador to Vietnam
- In office 1976–1979
- Preceded by: Usep Ranawidjaja
- Succeeded by: Ahmad Soedarsono

Chairman of the Indonesian National Party
- In office 15 September 1969 – 12 April 1970
- Preceded by: Osa Maliki (died)
- Succeeded by: Hadisubeno Sosrowerdojo

Legislative offices
- 1957–1959: Deputy Prime Minister of Indonesia under Djuanda Kartawidjaja
- 1956–1968: Member of the People's Representative Council from Djakarta Raya
- 1953–1954: Member of the Regional People's Representative Council of Jakarta

Personal details
- Born: 23 May 1918 Pati, Dutch East Indies
- Died: 23 April 1998 (aged 79) Jakarta, Indonesia
- Party: Indonesian National Party (1946–1965; 1966–1973); Indonesian Democratic Party (1973–1998)
- Education: Gadjah Mada University (Mr.)
- Occupation: Politician; civil servant

Hardi (23 May 1918 – 23 April 1998) was an Indonesian politician who served as Deputy Prime Minister in the Djuanda Cabinet between 1957 and 1959 and Ambassador of Indonesia to Vietnam between 1976 and 1979.

== Biography ==
Hardi was born in Pati Regency, today in Central Java, on 23 May 1918. He received a bachelor's in law from Gadjah Mada University. He worked as a civil servant in Pati during the Japanese occupation of the Dutch East Indies, and also for a period of time at the traditional law office.

=== Sukarno period ===
After the independence of Indonesia, Hardi began working at the economic department, and then the interior department until 1953. He worked around his hometown in Pati, assigned to Central Java and Yogyakarta. He also briefly studied in the United Kingdom under a government scholarship. He had joined the Indonesian National Party (PNI) in 1946, and for a year between 1953 and 1954 he served in the Jakarta Regional People's Representative Council. He ran as a legislative candidate for the 1955 Indonesian legislative election and won a seat to represent PNI.

Hardi was considered a rising star in politics after his election into the People's Representative Council (DPR). He was appointed as chairman of the PNI's faction within it. He was appointed Deputy Prime Minister in the Djuanda Cabinet, being sworn in on 9 April 1957. During this term as Deputy Prime Minister, Hardi was responsible for negotiations (leading a delegation dubbed as the "Hardi Mission") with Darul Islam militias in Aceh, which resulted in the recognition of Aceh as a special region by the central government in May 1959. He stopped being a legislator in 1968.

=== New Order ===
Hardi remained a member of the People's Consultative Assembly until his resignation in 1970. Around this time, he was also removed from the PNI's leadership following a party congress in Semarang, and he later became a member of the Indonesian Democratic Party. Prior to his ousting, he was the party leadership committee's first chairman. He also became a member of the Supreme Advisory Council, and served as Ambassador to Vietnam between 1976 and 1979, for which he resigned from his advisory position.

While during the 1970s it was common practice for the Suharto government to place military officers in ambassadorial posts, Vietnam was an exception, and Suharto apparently noted to Hardi that "he was not yet able to put a military or a career diplomat as an ambassador to Hanoi". His ambassadorship was during a period where the Indonesian government wanted Vietnam to both curb the flow of refugees from the country and withdraw troops from Cambodia, and during his tenure Vietnam agreed to the former request. Additionally, in 1976, when the Communist Party of Vietnam was about to hold a party congress, a diplomatic move by Hardi dissuaded the Vietnamese from inviting representatives from the Indonesian Communist Party (PKI), who were then in exile in Beijing. The Vietnamese then took a dual-track policy regarding the PKI, i.e. that the Vietnamese Communist Party would recognize the PKI, but the Vietnamese state would not. The Vietnamese also wished to distance themselves from Beijing, and saw not inviting PKI as an opportunity to improve relations with Indonesia.

== Personal life ==
Hardi was married to Lasmidjah Hardi.

Hardi died on 23 April 1998 in Jakarta, shortly after his wife's death on 10 March that same year.
