= Serindo =

Political party in Indonesia (1945–1946)

Indonesian People's Union Serikat Rakjat Indonesia (Note: Under modern Indonesian orthography, the word Rakjat would be spelled as Rakyat.)
- Abbreviation: Serindo
- General Secretary: Ki Sarmidi Mangunsarkoro
- Founded: 13 December 1945
- Dissolved: 29 January 1946
- Succeeded by: Indonesian National Party
- Headquarters: Jakarta
- Ideology: Indonesian nationalism

The Indonesian People's Union (Indonesian: Serikat Rakjat Indonesia), better known as Serindo, was a short-lived nationalist political party in Indonesia which existed from December 1945 to January 1946. It was the predecessor to the Indonesian National Party.

== History ==
Following the 3 November 1945 declaration, discussions regarding the creation of a new political party were held in the Central Indonesian National Committee (KNIP) by Sartono, Ki Sarmidi Mangunsarkoro, and Osa Maliki. This discussion was continued at a larger meeting at the house of Suwiryo, the mayor of Jakarta, on 4 December 1945. On 13 December 1945, the creation of Serindo was announced and a provisional leadership established in order to negotiate with other nationalist groups and prepare for Serindo's first congress.

Three days later, it was made public that Ki Sarmidi Mangunsarkoro, the general-secretary of Serindo, would coordinate those activities, with the help of Osa Maliki and Lukman Hakim. The party congress was held between 28 January and 1 February 1946 in the town of Kediri, East Java. In this congress, Serindo united with several other nationalist groups in order to form the Indonesian National Party (PNI). These groups included the PNI-Pati, PNI-Madiun, PNI-Sumatra, and PNI-Sulawesi which were branches of the stillborn PNI-Staatspartij, an abortive attempt at creating a one-party state, that was launched in August 1945. The remaining groups were the People's Sovereignty Party founded by Sujono Hadinoto and the Republic of Indonesia Party founded by Soeradji, both of which likely only consisted of the personal followers of their founders.

This congress also saw the establishment of the PNI's formal ideology, that of "Socio-National-Democracy" (Sosio-Nasional-Demokrasi), as well as the party's logo of a triangle with a banteng's head which symbolizes the synthesis between nationalism-democracy and socialism. The PNI ideology only varied slightly from that of Serindo, and closely followed the principles put forward by Sukarno in the pre-war PNI. Meanwhile, the PNI adopted Serindo's program in its entirety. The PNI considered this congress in Kediri to be the party's first congress. Within the party, Ki Sarmidi Mangunsarkoro served as chairman with Djody Gondokusumo becoming vice-chairman.

== See also ==
- Indonesian National Party
