= Indonesian National Party =

Former political party in Indonesia

Indonesian National Party Partai Nasional Indonesia
- Abbreviation: PNI
- Founders: Sukarno; Sartono; Iskaq Tjokrohadisurjo; Cipto Mangunkusumo
- Founded: 4 July 1927 (first incarnation); 21 August 1945 (second incarnation); 29 January 1946 (third incarnation)
- Dissolved: 25 April 1931 (first incarnation); 31 August 1945 (second incarnation); 10 January 1973 (third incarnation)
- Merger of: Serindo; People's Sovereignty Party; Indonesian Republic Party; PNI branches; smaller local parties
- Merged into: Indonesian Democratic Party
- Succeeded by: Claimed: Indonesian National Party Marhaenism; Indonesian National Party – Marhaen Masses; Indonesian National Party – Marhaenist Front; Partindo; Indonesian Nationalist Education
- Headquarters: Jl. Salemba Raya No.73, Senen, Central Jakarta, Jakarta
- Newspaper: Suluh Indonesia
- Student wing: Indonesian National Student Movement
- Youth wing: Indonesian Democratic Youth, Marhaenist Youth Movement
- Women's wing: Indonesian Democratic Women
- Membership: 10,000 (1929); 1,466,783 (1950)
- Ideology: Indonesian nationalism; Revolutionary nationalism; Left-wing nationalism; Anti-colonialism; Anti-imperialism; Marhaenism; Pancasila
- Political position: Centre-left to left-wing Faction: Right-wing to far-right

The Indonesian National Party (Indonesian: Partai Nasional Indonesia, PNI) was the name used by several nationalist political parties in Indonesia from 1927 until 1973. The first PNI was established by future President Sukarno. After independence, the new PNI supplied a number of prime ministers, and participated in the majority of cabinets in the 1950s and 1960s. The party was fused into the Indonesian Democratic Party in 1973. In the years following the reforms of the late 1990s, a number of parties claiming to be the continuation of previous PNIs stood in elections, but gained only a handful of seats.

== Pre-independence ==
In November 1925, Sukarno, then a young engineer studying at the Bandung Technical College, founded the Algemeene Studie Club, a study club inspired by a similar organization founded by Soetomo in Surabaya. The study club was later reformed on 4 July 1927 into a movement called the Indonesian National Association. In May 1928, the name was changed to the Indonesian National Party. The organization's aim was economic and political independence for the Indonesian archipelago. This would be achieved by non-cooperation with the Dutch colonial regime. By the end of 1929, the organization had 10,000 members. This alarmed the authorities, and Sukarno and seven party leaders were arrested in December 1929. They were put on trial for being a threat to public order and in September 1930 received sentences of one to three years – Sukarno received the longest sentence. Without its leader, the party was paralyzed. Wishing to make a fresh start free of the stigma of a court verdict against it, at an extraordinary party congress on 25 April 1931, the PNI was dissolved.

In December 1930, Sutan Sjahrir established an organization called Indonesian Nationalist Education (Indonesian: Pendidikan Nasional Indonesia), known as the New PNI (PNI Baru) as a rival to the Indonesia Party (Partindo), which was itself a replacement for the original PNI. Rather than confronting the Dutch, the PNI-Baru aimed to nurture future political leaders, rather than take direct action. In 1932, Mohammad Hatta became the organization's leader, but two years later he and Sjahrir were arrested and the PNI-Baru faded away.

== The PNI state party ==
In a meeting of the Preparatory Committee for Indonesian Independence (PPKI) on August 19, two days after the Indonesian Declaration of Independence, newly appointed President Sukarno suggested the establishment of a state party as a vehicle for the people to support the government. Two days later, the PPKI established the state party, which was named the Indonesian National Party after Sukarno's pre-war party. On August 23, Sukarno spoke in the radio and welcomed the new party, which was a direct continuation of the wartime Japanese Jawa Hokokai (Java Service Association), saying he hoped it would unite all sections of society.

On August 27, the party leadership was announced. However, given the close connections these individuals had with the Japanese wartime regime, two days later a revised permanent leadership was named. The party would be led by Sukarno, with Hatta as his deputy, the same positions they had held in the Hokokai. Other members of the organization were appointed to senior positions in the party. There were a few representatives of pre-war Islamic parties, members representing ethnic minorities and youth activists with ties to Sukarno. It was seen by some as a smooth transition of leadership from the Japanese administration to the Indonesian government. However its associations with the Japanese occupation made it unpopular and it lacked internal cohesion. As a result, it was dissolved at the end of August.

== The rebirth of the PNI as a popular political party ==
On 29 January 1946, the Indonesian National Party was revived as a merger of the recently established Indonesia People's Union (Serindo) and a number of smaller parties, together with activists from parties including Parindra and Partindo, but this time without Sukarno, who as president, was above politics. The party attracted considerable support due to its having the same name as Sukarno's original party as well as the short-lived party of August 1945. It was supported by the a large proportion of republican administrative officers who had been members of the Dutch East Indies, as well as their subordinates and older former members of the pre-war party. Other support came from the Indonesia middle class, and left-wingers. This very broad range of membership made the party rather "unwieldy". The leadership was politically closer to the left wing of the party. During the Indonesian National Revolution, the party opposed negotiating with the Dutch, and disagreed with the socialist stance of the early Indonesian cabinets. Its leadership, dominated by figures from the old PNI and Partindo gave the party a "radical-nationalist" stance.

Because of its support among regional administrators, when the Working Body of the KNIP, which carried out the day-to-day duties of the full KNIP, was increased in size to 25 members, the PNI was awarded ten seats. A subsequent reorganisation of the KNIP in July 1946 saw the PNI being given 45 of the 200 seats. PNI members were subsequently appointed to four posts in the Third Sjahrir Cabinet, including minister of justice and vice-minister of finance.

In November 1946, the Linggadjati Agreement was signed between the Republic of Indonesia and the Netherlands. The PNI was critical of a number of its provisions. In an expansion of the KNIP to 514 seats, ostensibly to make it more representative, but also to ensure that the Linggadjati Agreement was ratified, the PNI gained no more seats, while its representation in the working committee fell to 5 of the 47 seats. Following the signature of the agreement, PNI and Masyumi members resigned in protest, bringing down the Second Amir Sjarifuddin Cabinet. The PNI was given two seats (later three) in the presidential cabinet that replaced it.

During 1948, the PNI right wing was increasingly sidelined in deciding party policy, and the centre-left grouping became dominant. Speeches at the party's third annual congress in June 1948 emphasized socialist ideals. As a result, in November 1948, right-wingers who also supported Prime Minister Hatta's policy of negotiating with the Dutch, putting them at odds with the majority of the membership, split off to form the Great Indonesia Unity Party (PIR). Following the Dutch recognition of Indonesian sovereignty at the end of 1949, the PNI had two seats in the cabinet of the United States of Indonesia (RUSI). Hatta depended on PNI-Masyumi support: the PNI was pro-unitary state, but Hatta and Masyumi were more cautious. From April 1950, there were growing differences between the PNI and Masyumi. In July, a group of PNI members dissatisfied with the selection of Sidik Djojosukarto as party chairman split off and formed the Indonesian National Party – Freedom (PNI Merdeka), subsequently renamed the National People's Party (PRN). This left the radical-nationalists such as chairman Sidik Djojosukarto greater control over the party

== The Liberal Democracy era ==
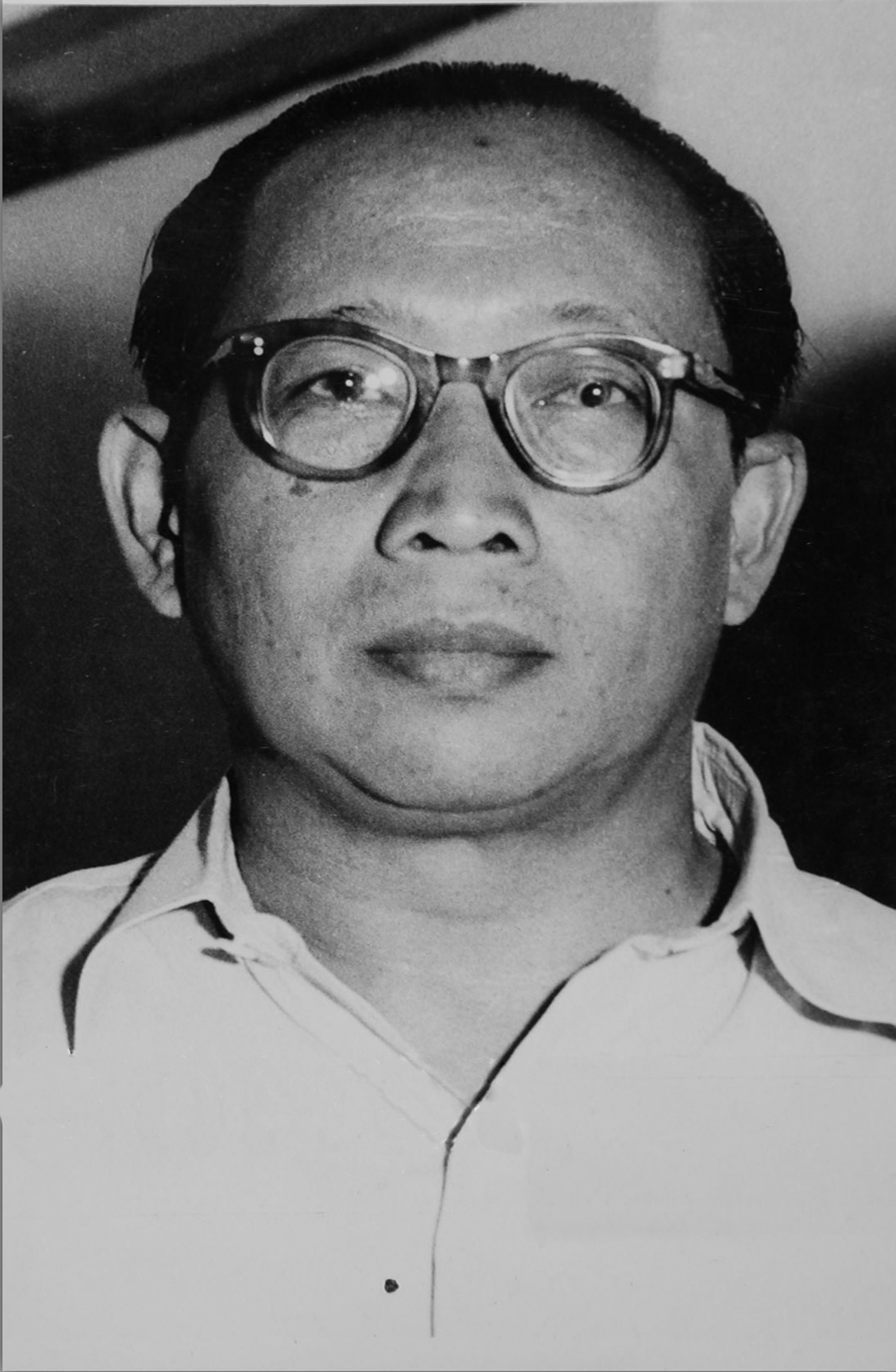
Sidik Djojosukarto, PNI chairman 1950–1955

After the dissolution of the RUSI and the reestablishment of the unitary state in August 1950, the PNI refused to join the cabinet, claiming it had been offered too few posts for its 43 seats in the Provisional People's Representative Council. This was the first cabinet without PNI representation since the fall of the First Sjahrir Cabinet in early 1946. However, the next cabinet, formed in April 1951 was another Masyumi-PNI coalition. Despite this, the PNI leadership helped bring it down when its policies prioritized economic stability over radical nationalism.

The Wilopo Cabinet, in office from April 1952 – June 1953, was headed by the PNI's Wilopo. Despite this, support from the PNI rank and file was lukewarm, as the party grew closer to Communist Party of Indonesia (PKI) and more nationalist and radical. All four PNI ministers were accused of poor party discipline, and were criticised at the sixth PNI congress for their part in cabinet policies. Eventually, internal conflicts, particularly between the PNI and Masyumi, brought the cabinet down. It was replaced by another PNI-led cabinet, with Ali Sastroamidjojo as prime minister.

As the 1955 elections neared, the PNI leadership realized that it would need to raise funds and increase party membership. It took advantage of its cabinet positions to charge levies in return for permits and government loans. However, the increase in membership weakened the position of the highly centralized party leadership. Campaigning on a program that prioritized above all nationalism, together with a strong centralized government and secularism, the PNI came first in the 1955 Indonesian general election, with a 22.3% share of the vote. It was followed by Masyumi, the Nahdlatul Ulama (NU) and the PKI. The PNI thereby gained 57 of the 257 seats in parliament. Many of these new members of parliament were local branch leaders, who were replaced by new recruits. The cabinet resulting from the election was a coalition of the PNI, Masyumi and the NU, with Ali Sastroamidjojo returning to the post of prime minister. At the eighth party congress, shifts within the membership led to a narrow win for the conservative Suwirjo as party chairman. The same congress saw major changes to the organization of the party, with the establishment of a decentralized and inclusive Congress Working Committee to set party policy.

In 1956, tired of national political instability, President Sukarno called for the parties to be "buried" and spoke of his concept of "guided democracy". In the following year, as details of Sukarno's concept emerged, there were demonstrations in support of it. In March 1957, the regional Permesta rebellion broke out, and Army Chief of staff Naution proposed Sukarno declare martial law nationwide. Sukarno agreed, and on 14 March the cabinet resigned, and martial law came into force, thus ending parliamentary democracy. Sukarno and the Army were to use the six years it remained in force to take measures to limit the freedom of parties and to pass laws that the parties were opposed to.

== Guided Democracy to the end of the party ==
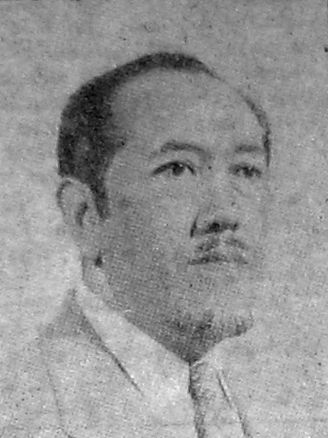
Ali Sastroamidjojo, PNI chairman and Indonesian prime minister

In May 1957, the Working Cabinet, which was officially non-party, passed an emergency law establishing a National Council based on functional groups. Its official purpose was to be "a reflection of society", to strengthen the position of the cabinet by associating it with Sukarno and to serve as a counterpoint to the party political system, in practice Sukarno wanted it to undermine the cabinet and parliament.

Meanwhile, the regional rebellion put the PNI in a difficult position as it simultaneously supported the central government and wanted to maintain its support in the outer (non-Java) islands. When local elections were held in Java and South Sumatra in 1957, the PKI made significant gains at the expense of the PNI, which dropped from first place (in the 1955 vote) to third. During the campaign, the campaign the PKI attacked the PNI for being a "half-way group", positioned indecisively between the political left and the right.

Disorganization and insubordination by regional party branches characterized the period under the chairmanship of Suwirjo, and resulted in left-wingers breaking away in July 1958 to found a new party called Partindo. At the same time, some of the PNI's mass organizations began to openly challenge the party leadership. They were supported in this by Sukarno and the Army, who both wanted to undermine the party system as part of the move towards Guided Democracy. Matters came to a head at the ninth party congress in July 1960 when these mass organizations joined forces with Sidik's radical nationalists to overturn the decentralization of party policymaking and elect Sidik ally Ali Sastroamidjojo as party chairman.

In 1963, martial law, with its restrictions on party activity, was lifted. From 28 August – 1 September, the PNI held its tenth annual congress. This resulted in a move to the left, both in the composition of the leadership and in party policy. The party ideology of Marhaenism was formally defined as "Marxism adapted to Indonesian conditions". The party began to move towards a mass-based organization, in line with the philosophy of Sukarno and the PKI. However, there were sharp internal divisions between the left-wing central party organization and the right-wing regional party leaders. These were manifested in the government's land reform program, with local party branches working with landlords to frustrate attempts to abide by the Land Reform law. When the PKI supported unilateral land seizures, local PNI members attacked the PKI.

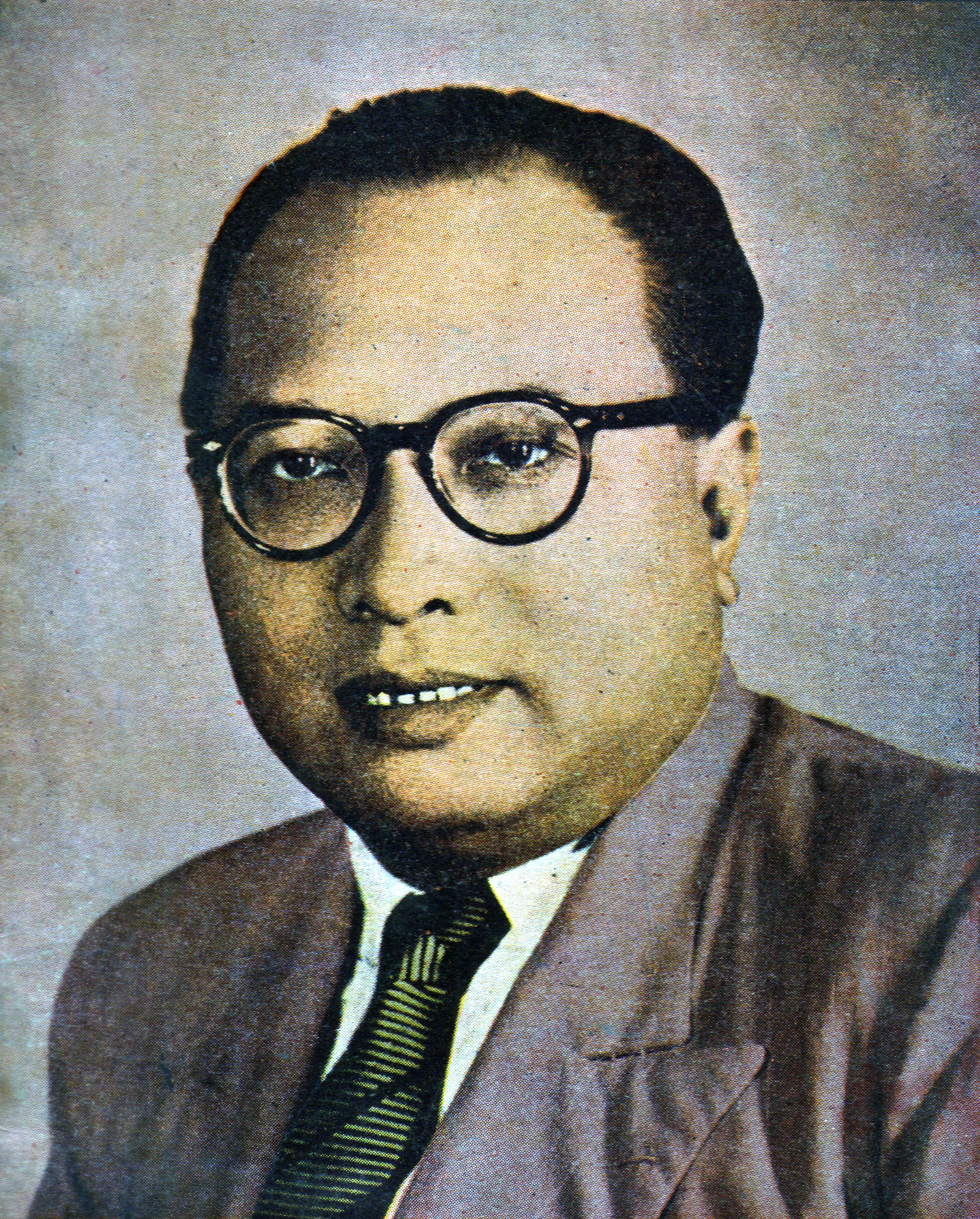
Hadisubeno Sosrowerdojo, the final PNI chairman

On 30 September 1965, a coup attempt took place that was subsequently blamed on the PKI. In the aftermath of this, the PNI, which was seen as a PKI-collaborator, faced strong pressure from the army to purge its left wing and pro-PKI faction, led by party chairman Ali Sastroamidjojo and Surachman. There was resistance to this from the party's Central and East Java branches, and this led to clashes with anti-Sukarno students in 1966 and 1967. The army subsequently banned PNI activities in Sumatra. However, conservatives Hardi and Suharto associate Hadisubeno Sosrowerdojo persuaded the party leadership to hold a "reunification" meeting in April 1966. Attendance at this meetings was controlled by the army and the left-wing group was forced out. Osa Maliki became chairman. On 21 December 1967, the PNI leadership declared that the party had abandoned its philosophy of Sukarno and his teachings, General Suharto, but then acting president – ordered local authorities to assist the party in "crystallization and New Order consolidation with itself". The now-weakened PNI was subsequently given 68 seats in the People's Representative Council, which had itself been purged of PKI members, making it the largest group. In April 1970, Osa Maliki died, and strong pressure from the army resulted in Hadisubeno, who was thought to be compliant with government aims, being selected as chairman. Along with eight other political parties and the government-sponsored Golkar organization, the PNI contested the 1971 elections. It came third, but won less than 7% of the vote. In 1973, the PNI along with other nationalist and Christian parties was merged into the Indonesian Democratic Party in order to limit the number of political parties and to weaken opposition to the regime.

== The revival of the PNI name ==
In October 1995 an organization called Indonesian National Union (Persatuan Nasional Indonesia) was established as a vehicle for PNI followers. At that time, it was still not possible to establish political parties. After the fall of President Suharto, its members agreed to revive the PNI. The party was officially declared on 17 July 1998 with the aims of upholding the unitary republic of Indonesia and opposing federalism as this could lead to national disintegration. Former PNI member Supeni was the first party chair. However, a number of other parties were also established, each claiming to be the heir of the old PNI. As a result, five different PNIs were registered with the Ministry of Justice. After a change in its articles of establishment, the PNI led by Probosutedjo declared itself as the PNI-Marhaenis Front (PNI-FM) on 10 February 1999, while a merger of two other PNIs resulted in the PNI-Marhaen Mass (PNI-MM) led by Bachtar Oscha Chalik.

All three parties contested the 1999 legislative election. The PNI-MM and the PNI-FM each won one seat in the legislature, but despite winning a larger share of the vote – 0.36% – Supeni's PNI won no seats. None of these parties achieved the threshold of votes allowing them to contest the 2004 legislative election. The PNI therefore changed its name to the PNI-Marhaenisme, which was officially declared in May 2002. Now led by Sukarno's daughter Sukmawati Sukarnoputri, it won only 0.31% of the vote in 2004 and no seats. The PNI-FM and PNI-MM under new names failed the verification process for the 2004 elections and did not contest the 2009, 2014 or 2019 elections.

== Election results ==
=== People's Representative Council ===
Election	Leader	Seats		Votes		Outcome of election
Election	Leader	No.	±	Total	%	Outcome of election
1955	Sidik Djojosukarto	57 / 257		8,434,653	22.32%	Opposition
1971	Mohammad Isnaeni	20 / 360	▼37	3,793,266	6.93%	Governing coalition

=== Constitutional Assembly ===
Election	Leader	Seats	Votes	% of votes	Bloc
1955	Sarmidi Mangunsarkoro	119 / 514	9,070,218	23.97%	Pancasila Bloc

== Leaders ==
No.	Name	Potrait	Constituency / title	Term of office		Election results
No.	Name	Potrait	Constituency / title	Took office	Left office	Election results
Chairman of the Indonesian National Party (1927–1973)
1	Sukarno (1901–1970)		—	4 July 1927	29 December 1929	1927 Unopposed
–	Sartono (1901–1970)		—	29 December 1929	25 April 1931	
Party dissolved
Successor parties: Partindo
1	Sukarno (1901–1970)		President of Indonesia	22 August 1945	1 September 1945	
Party dissolved
Preceded parties: Serindo, PNI Sumatera, PNI Pati, PNI Madiun, PNI Sulawesi, People's Sovereignty Party, Indonesian Republic Party and other smaller local parties
2	Ki Sarmidi Mangunsarkoro (1904–1957)		—	29 January 1946	4 March 1947	1946 Unopposed
3	Adnan Kapau Gani (1905–1968)		Minister of Welfare (Note: until 29 January 1948)	4 March 1947	November 1947	Mar. 1947 Unopposed
4	Sujono Hadinoto (1915–1977)		Rep for Republic of Indonesia (Note: since 17 February 1950)	November 1947	5 May 1950	Nov. 1947 Unopposed
5	Sidik Djojosukarto (1908–1955)		Member of the Provisional House of Representatives (Note: since 16 August 1950)	5 May 1950	9 September 1955 (Note: died in office)	1950 Unopposed
–	Ki Sarmidi Mangunsarkoro (1904–1957) (Acting)		Rep for Central Java (Note: since 4 March 1956)	9 September 1955	28 July 1956	
6	Suwiryo (1903–1967)		Member of the Constitutional Assembly (Note: 9 November 1956–5 July 1959)	28 July 1956	29 June 1960	1956 Unopposed
7	Ali Sastroamidjojo (1903–1975)		—	29 June 1960	27 April 1966	1960 Unopposed
8	Osa Maliki Wangsadinata (1907–1969)		Member of the House of Representatives–Mutual Assistance (Note: until 9 February 1968)	27 April 1966	15 September 1969 (Note: died in office)	1966 Unopposed
–	Hardi (1918–1998) (Acting)		Member of the People's Consultative Assembly	15 September 1969	12 April 1970	
9	Hadisubeno Sosrowerdojo (1912–1971)		—	12 April 1970	24 April 1971 (Note: died in office)	1970 Unopposed
–	Mohammad Isnaeni (1919–2002) (Acting)		Rep for Central Java (Note: since 28 October 1971)	24 April 1971	14 January 1973	1971 Unopposed
Merged into: Indonesian Democratic Party
