= Ki Sarmidi Mangunsarkoro =

Indonesian politician and national hero (1904–1957)

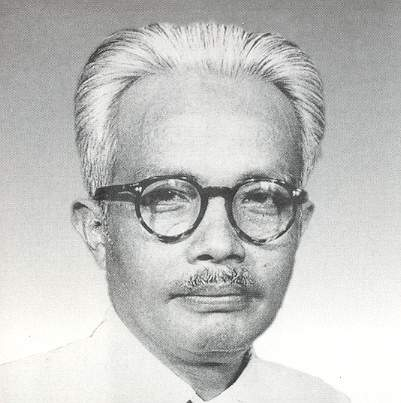
- Official portrait, c. 1949

6th Minister of Education and Culture
- In office 4 August 1949 – 15 August 1950
- Preceded by: Ali Sastroamidjojo
- Succeeded by: Bahder Djohan

2nd Chairman of the Indonesian National Party
- In office 29 January 1946 – 4 March 1947
- Preceded by: Sukarno (Note: The Indonesian National Party was previously chaired by Sukarno shortly after the declaration of Indonesian independence, but it had been dissolved in September 1945)
- Succeeded by: Adnan Kapau Gani

Personal details
- Born: 23 May 1904 Surakarta, Dutch East Indies
- Died: 8 June 1957 (aged 53) Jakarta, Indonesia

Ki Sarmidi Mangunsarkoro (23 May 1904 – 8 June 1957) acted as the Minister of Education and Culture of Indonesia in 1949 until 1950. He is now regarded as a National Hero of Indonesia.

== Early life ==
Ki Sarmidi Mangunsarkoro was born on May 23, 1904, in Surakarta. He grew up in the family environment of Surakarta Palace employees. After graduating from the "Arjuna" Teacher School in Jakarta, he worked as a teacher in a Taman Siswa school in Yogyakarta.

Then in 1929, Ki Sarmidi Mangunsarkoro was appointed Principal of HIS Budi Utomo Jakarta. One year later, at the request of the residents of Kemayoran and Ki Hadjar Dewantara's blessing, he founded Perguruan Tamansiswa in Jakarta. Perguruan Tamansiswa in Jakarta was a merger between HIS Budi Utomo and HIS Marsudi Rukun, both of which were led by Ki Sarmidi Mangunsarkoro, and in its development, Perguruan Tamansiswa Jakarta Branch has progressed rapidly until now.

== Education goals ==
In 1930-1938 Mangunsarkoro was a Member of the Executive Board of the Indonesian National Scout Management (KBI), and advocated for the movement to be free from the influence of Dutch colonialism. From 1932 until 1940, he served as Chairman of the Education and Teaching Department of the Tamansiswa Luhur Assembly and concurrently as General Leader of Tamansiswa West Java. Furthermore, In 1933 Ki Sarmidi Mangunsarkoro held the Leadership of Taman Dewasa Raya in Jakarta which was specifically in charge of Education and Teaching.

His work on education was increasingly recognised in the educational environment in Indonesia as well as in the political environment through the Indonesian National Party (PNI). In 1928 he appeared as a speaker at the 28 October 1928 Youth Congress, in turn with several other speakers, including Mohammad Yamin, Purnomowulan, Ramelan, and Sunario, advocating children's right to get national education and be educated democratically, as well as the need for a balance between education at school and at home.

Ki Sarmidi Mangunsarkoro was then elected as the second PNI Chairman, replacing Sukarno in managing the party, as a result of the Indonesian People's Union Congress (Serindo) in Kediri and opposed the politics of compromise with the Netherlands (Linggarjati and Renvile Agreements). During the Second Dutch Aggression in Yogyakarta, Ki Sarmidi Mangunsarkoro was detained by the Inlichtingen Voor Geheimediensten (IVG) and imprisoned in Wirogunan.

=== Service at Taman Siswa ===
At the closing ceremony of the first Tamansiswa Congress or General Meeting in Yogyakarta on 13 August 1930, Ki Sarmidi Mangunsarkoro together with Ki Sadikin, Ki S. Djojoprajitno, Ki Poeger, Ki Kadiroen, and Ki Safioedin Soerjopoetro on behalf of the Tamansiswa Association throughout Indonesia signed a Statement of Acceptance of the submission of the "Charter of Unity of the Founding Agreement" from the hands of Ki Hadjar Dewantara, Ki Tjokrodirjo, and Ki Pronowidigdo to realise an educational effort based on the life and livelihood of the nation under the name Tamansiswa which was founded on 3 July 1922 in Yogyakarta.

As one of the people chosen by Ki Hadjar Dewantara to advance, promote, and modernise the Taman siswa system based on a sense of love for the country and national spirit, Ki Sarmidi Mangunsarkoro has several thoughts for the implementation of the ideals of Taman siswa education. Furthermore, in 1931 Ki Sarmidi Mangunsarkoro was assigned to compile a New Lesson Plan and in 1932 it was approved as the Mangunsarkoro Lesson List. Based on this task, in 1932 he also wrote the book 'Introduction to the National Teacher.' The book was reprinted in 1935.

In the 'Mangunsarkoro List of Lessons', which reflects the ideals of Taman siswa and the Introduction to the National Teacher in the current national movement in Indonesia and Asia in general, it can be concluded that his thoughts represent one aspect of the awakening of nationalism, namely the "cultural aspect", which is essentially an effort to test the laws of decency and teach various reforms adapted to nature and the times. The other two aspects are "socio-economic aspects", namely efforts to improve the status of the people by overthrowing the economic grip of Western European nations, while the "political aspect", namely efforts to seize political power from the hands of the Dutch Colonial Government.

In 1947 Ki Sarmidi Mangunsarkoro was given the task by Ki Hadjar Dewantara to lead a research to formulate the basics of Taman siswa's struggle, with a starting point from the 1922 Tamansiswa Principles. In the General Meeting of Taman siswa in 1947, the work of Mangunsarkoro's committee named Pancadarma was accepted and became the foundation of Taman siswa, namely: Kodrat Alam, Independence, Culture, Nationality, and Humanity.

== Minister of Education ==
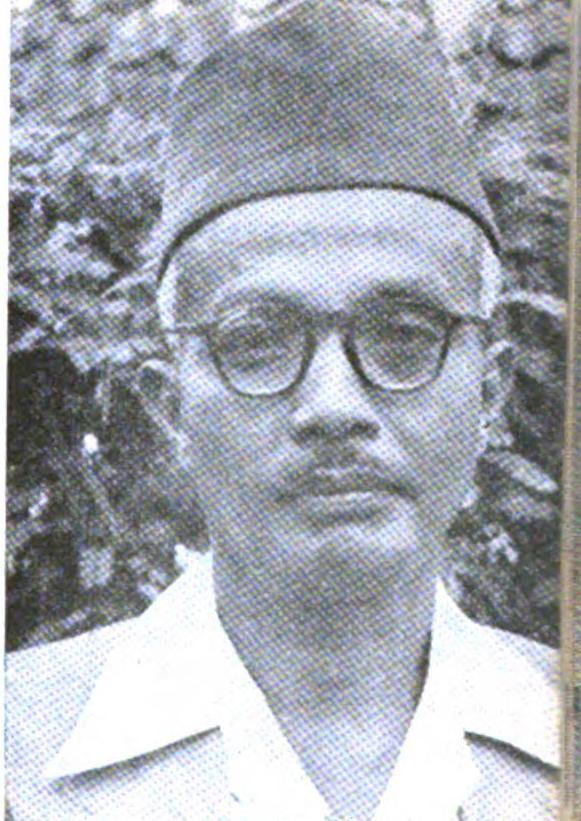
Sarmidi Mangunsarkoro, c. 1954

During the Second Hatta government from August 1949 until January 1950, Ki Sarmidi Mangunsarkoro worked as the Minister of Education, Teaching, and Culture (PP and K) of the Republic of Indonesia. While serving as Minister of PP and K, he founded and inaugurated the Indonesian Academy of Fine Arts (ASRI) in Yogyakarta, established the Karawitan Conservatory in Surakarta, and helped found Gadjah Mada University (UGM) Yogyakarta.

The Government's trust in his reputation and dedication to the State led Ki Sarmidi Mangunsarkoro to be entrusted again as Minister of PP and K RI during the Halim Cabinet from January 1950 to September 1950, and he succeeded in compiling and fighting in parliament Law No. 4/1950 on the Basics of Education and Teaching in Schools for all Indonesia. Law No. 4/1950 was passed and became the first National Education Law.

== Personal life ==
Ki Sarmidi Mangunsarkoro's modest, national-minded persona and a thick sense of nationalism were reflected in his daily appearance, which always wore a slightly rounded Peci, a thick moustache, a white Schiller shirt, and a Samarinda sarong and wore sandals. He also applied a very simple appearance when he was Minister of PP and K, that is, he did not want to live in the ministerial residence. When attending presidential banquets, on the road, or travelling to Jakarta, he always wore a sarong and Peci.

Ki Sarmidi Mangunsarkoro died on 8 June 1957 in Jakarta, buried in the Taman siswa family graveyard in Taman Wijaya Brata, Celeban, Yogyakarta. For his services, the late Ki Sarmidi Mangunsarkoro received the Bintang Mahaputra Adipradana from the government, as well as honours from Tamansiswa and the people.
