= Mohammad Isnaeni =

Indonesian politician (1919–2002)

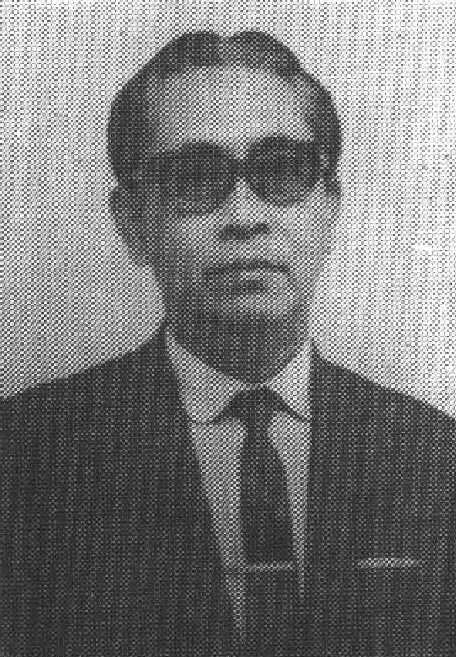
- Official portrait, c. 1971

1st Chairman of the Indonesian Democratic Party
- In office 11 January 1973 – 20 February 1975
- Preceded by: Office established
- Succeeded by: Sanusi Hardjadinata

10th Chairman of the Indonesian National Party
- In office 24 April 1971 – 10 January 1973
- Preceded by: Hadisubeno Sosrowerdojo
- Succeeded by: Office abolished

Legislative offices
- 1977–1982: Member of the People's Representative Council from Jakarta
- 1966–1982: Deputy Speaker of the People's Representative Council
- 1956–1977: Member of the People's Representative Council from Central Java

Personal details
- Born: 19 April 1919 Ponorogo, Dutch East Indies
- Died: 27 October 2002 (aged 83) Jakarta, Indonesia
- Party: PDI (1973–2002)
- Other political affiliations: Gerindo (1940–1942); PNI (1946–1973)
- Spouse: Juniati Isnaeni
- Relations: Agus Widjojo (son-in-law)
- Occupation: Politician
- Awards: Satya Lencana Perang Kemerdekaan I and II (17 August 1958); Mahaputra Star Adipradana (19 May 1973); Order of Tudor Vladimirescu (29 March 1986)

Mohammad Isnaeni (19 April 1919 – 27 October 2002) was an Indonesian politician, who was one of the longest serving deputy speakers of the People's Representative Council, elected for four consecutive terms, from 1966 until 1982. He was a member and de facto chairman of the Indonesian National Party (PNI) until the PNI's merger into the new Indonesian Democratic Party (PDI), of which he was also chairman.

== Early life and education ==
=== Early life ===
Mohammad Isnaeni was born in Ponorogo, East Java. His father was a man named Khasan Yahya, who was a religion teacher from an ulama family in Tegalsari, Ponorogo, whose students were from Tegalsari and outside the region. His mother was a woman named Umiyati, which came from a pesantren family in Pacitan. Isnaeni also had three brothers, namely Ngam, Isngat, and Istijab.

=== Education ===
Isnaeni was educated in the People's School (Sekolah Rakyat), in Ponorogo, graduating in 1932. After finishing his primary school, Isnaeni continued to study in the Ponorogo Junior High School from 1933 to 1936. He then attended teacher's school, graduating in 1939.

== Youth ==
=== Activism ===
Since 1936, Isnaeni had been active in the Indonesian Youth in Jogjakarta. In the same year, he was chosen as the chairman of the students' union of the Taman Siswa branch in Mataram, Jogjakarta. His further activity led him to become one of the precursors to the establishment of the Indonesian Democratic Youth. He was elected as the chairman of the Indonesian Democratic Youth twice, in its first and second congress in October 1947 and February 1948. During his term, he established the National Youth Front, comprising the Indonesian Democratic Youth, Islamic Youth Movement of Indonesia, Christian Youth, Catholic Youth, and the Young Communist Force, rivaling the BKPRI, a similar organization which has been dominated by the Socialist Youth of Indonesia. He resigned from the post in 1954 due to his activity in the Indonesian National Party and his post as the Head of Information Office in the Indonesian Embassy in Peking.

=== Scouting ===
Isnaeni was also active in the scouting activity of Indonesia. From 1936 to 1939, he had been active as a Class I Scout in the Indonesian Nation Scouting, together with Bung Tomo. After that, he seated the Madiun branch office of the Indonesian Nation Scouting from 1940 to 1942. During his time in the office, he met Siti Juniati Waltien, who later became his future wife.

=== Indonesian National Revolution ===
During the war of independence, he joined forces with Lieutenant Colonel Soeprapto Sukowati until the Roem-Roijen agreement was reached and the transfer of sovereignty from the Netherlands to the republic.

== Political career ==
=== Gerindo party ===
Isnaeni entered Gerindo in July 1940. Shortly after his entry, he was chosen as the branch secretary of Gerindo in Madiun. His position in Gerindo connected him with national political figures, such as Wilopo and Adam Malik. He knew Adam Malik deeper due to Malik's position as the chairman of the Agitprop Department of Gerindo, and also due to Malik's frequent travel to the area.

He quit the party in 1942, after the invasion of the Dutch East Indies by the Japanese Empire.

=== Indonesian National Party ===
After the independence of Indonesia, Isnaeni became active in politics again. He joined the Indonesian National Party in February 1946, and became the delegation for the Madiun branch of the party in the 1947 PNI Congress, which was located on his branch.

==== 1955 elections ====
Since 1958, Isnaeni was seated as the leading member of the Central Executive Council of PNI. On 29 June 1960, at the 9th Congress of the Indonesian National Party in Solo, Isnaeni was re-chosen as the principal member of the Central Executive Council of PNI, and at the next congress of the party in Solo in 1963, he was elected as the vice general secretary, with Surachman seated as the general secretary position. His disagreements with Surachman made him get fired from the party, along with 10 other figures from PNI. These figures later formed the Osa-Usep faction of the party in October 1964, named after the chairman and general secretary of the faction, Osa Maliki and Usep Hadisubeno. The faction was strictly anti-communist, as opposed to the communist Surachman. Surachman later found to be an Indonesian Communist Party cadre that entered PNI to disrupt the party.

==== 30 September incident ====
After the 30 September incident, PNI was "cleaned" by the government. The Surachman faction (known as Asu faction) was eliminated from the party, making the Osa-Usep faction the legitimate form of the party.

== Family ==
Isnaeni was married to Juniati. Isnaeni met Juniati in the Indonesian Nation Scouting in Madiun. Both were married on 8 March 1942 at 9.00. At that time, the Imperial Japanese Navy Air Service were bombarding the airfield in Maospati, Madiun, and the Imperial Japanese Army were invading Madiun, causing the disruption of the marriage.

The marriage resulted in seven children:

Name	Born	Location
Hertina Eniyati	7 July 1943	Madiun
Herlina Hinayati	22 April 1947	Madiun
Hinayana	18 May 1950	Semarang
Hendrayana	24 September 1953	Jakarta
Hendrajaya	29 April 1956	Peking
Hendrasmara	9 April 1960	Jakarta
Herina Fitrianita	25 February 1963	Jakarta
