= Indonesian National Party Marhaenism =

Political party in Indonesia

Indonesian National Party of Marhaenism Partai Nasional Indonesia Marhaenisme
- Abbreviation: PNIM/PNI-M
- Chairman: Sukmawati Sukarnoputri
- Secretary-General: Ardy Muhammad
- Founded: 20 May 2002
- Merger of: PNI-Supeni; PNI-MM
- Preceded by: PNI
- Headquarters: Jalan Cilandak III No.23, RT.3/RW.3, Cilandak Bar., Cilandak, Kota Jakarta Selatan, Daerah Khusus Ibukota Jakarta 12430
- Membership (2017): 1,177
- Ideology: Pancasila; Sukarnoism; Marhaenism; Indonesian nationalism
- Political position: Left-wing to centre-left
- Anthem: Mars Marhaen Indonesia
- Ballot number: 15
- DPR seats: 0

Website
- https://dpp-pni.tripod.com/

The Indonesian National Party of Marhaenism (Indonesian: Partai Nasional Indonesia Marhaenisme, PNIM), formerly known as the Indonesian National Party – Supeni (Indonesian: Partai Nasional Indonesia – Supeni, PNI-Supeni), is a minor political party in Indonesia founded by former Indonesian National Party (PNI) member Supeni Pudjobuntoro in 1995 before changing to the current incarnation in 2002. The party is headed by Sukmawati Sukarnoputri, daughter of national founder Sukarno.

The party participated in 2004 election, where it won one seat, and 2009 election, where it lost its parliamentary representation. The party did not participate in subsequent general elections.

== History ==
On 26 October 1995, former PNI member Supeni established the Indonesian National Union (Indonesian: Persatuan Nasional Indonesia). With the 1998 fall of President Suharto, came the chance to revive the Indonesian National Party. At a meeting on 20 May 1998 it was decided to change the name of the Indonesian National Union, and on 17 June 1998 the Indonesian National Party (PNI) was declared. It subsequently became known as PNI-Supeni to distinguish it from the other versions of the PNI, all claiming to be descendants of the old party.

In December 1998 PNI-Supeni merged with PNI-Massa Marhaen (Marhaen Masses), but contested the 1999 legislative election independently, winning 0.33% of votes, and gaining one seat in the People's Representative Council. After the election, the party name was changed to Indonesian National Party of Marhaenism so the party could compete in the 2004 elections. On 4 July 2000, Sukmawati Sukarnoputri, one of the daughters of Indonesia's first president, Sukarno, became party chairwoman. The party won 0.8% of the votes and again finished with one seat in the People's Representative Council.

The party contested the 2009 legislative election, but won only 0.3 percent of the vote, less than the 2.5 percent electoral threshold, thereby losing its only seat in the People's Representative Council.

Although the party did not participate in 2014 elections, they endorsed Joko Widodo (Jokowi) and Jusuf Kalla candidate pair in the presidential election. Jokowi-Kalla pair eventually won the election. The party reiterated its support to Jokowi's government by naming him the chief of the party's advisory council at the party congress in 2016, despite Jokowi being a part of the Indonesian Democratic Party of Struggle (PDI-P).

== Election results ==
Election	Ballot number	Total seats won	Total votes	Share of votes	Outcome of election
2004	1	1 / 550	906,739	0.80%	▲1 seat
2009	15	0 / 560	317,433	0.31%	▼1 seat
