= Partindo =

Indonesia Party Partai Indonesia
- Abbreviation: Partindo
- Chairman: Sartono
- Founded: April 1931, August 1958
- Dissolved: 1936, 1966
- Preceded by: Indonesian National Party
- Newspaper: Bintang Timur
- Membership (1933): 20,000
- Ideology: Nationalism

The Indonesia Party (Indonesian: Partai Indonesia), better known as Partindo, was a nationalist political party in Indonesia that existed before independence and was revived in 1957 as a leftist party.

== Pre-independence party ==
In 1927, future Indonesian president Sukarno established the pro-independence Indonesian National Party (PNI). Two years later, the concerned Dutch East Indies administration arrested and jailed Sukarno, and the PNI was banned. At the end of April 1931, Sartono, a former leading figure in the PNI, established the Indonesia Party (Partindo). It attracted the majority of the PNI membership and campaigned for Indonesian independence from the Dutch but was less radical than the PNI. A number of former PNI members refused to work with Partindo, and established the Indonesian National Education Club. When he was released from prison at the end of 1931, Sukarno tried to bring the two organizations together, but he failed to do so and eventually joined Partindo afterwards. The party expanded rapidly, from 3,000 members in 1932 to reach 20,000 by the middle of 1933. As a result of his continuing pro-independence activism, Sukarno was arrested and exiled without charge, and in 1936 Partindo dissolved itself.

== Revival ==
Following splits in the post-independence PNI, a number of leading party members, including Winoto Danuasmoro and Wianrno Danuatmdjo, decided to establish a new Partindo, choosing the name for symbolic reasons as the original Partindo had also emerged from the PNI. Its membership came from the PNI and from people who associated the party with President Sukarno. Partindo espoused the same ideology as the PNI, Marhaenism, which the party leaders stated was "Marxism adjusted to Indonesian conditions". The party newspaper was Bintang Timur (Star of the East) By the beginning of the 1960s, having failed to expand or broaden its membership base, the party had come under the influence of the Communist Party of Indonesia (PKI). Some PKI members joined Partindo, and gradually took control of the leadership. In August 1964, Sukarno reshuffled his cabinet to bring it into line with the policies outlined in his "Year of Living Dangerously" independence day speech, and Partindo member Sutomo Martopradoto was appointed Minister of Labor. Following the 1965 coup attempt by the 30 September Movement, which was blamed on the PKI, Sukarno transferred authority to General Suharto on 11 March 1966. Suharto used his new powers to ban the PKI, and shortly after, the Partindo offices in Jakarta in Surabaya were taken over and the party itself was banned because of its pro-communist stance.
