= Hōkōkai =

Associations formed by Japanese empire

The Hōkōkai (Japanese: 奉公会, romanized: Hōkōkai, lit. 'Service Society'; Indonesian: Himpunan Kebaktian Rakjat) were associations formed by the Empire of Japan on 8 January 1944 to replace the Pusat Tenaga Rakyat (Putera; "People's Power Center") during the Japanese occupation of the Dutch East Indies (present-day Indonesia) in World War II. The original incarnation of the Hōkōkai was formed on Java by the commander of the Sixteenth Army, General Kumakichi Harada, after the Japanese realized that the Putera had exacerbated the desire for Indonesian independence rather than promote Japan's local interests in its war against the Allies.

Unlike Putera, the Hōkōkai avoided inclusion of Japanese officials in its membership. Instead, members were community leaders from across social classes, both native Indonesians and other ethnic groups such as the Chinese, Indians, and Arabs.

== On Java ==
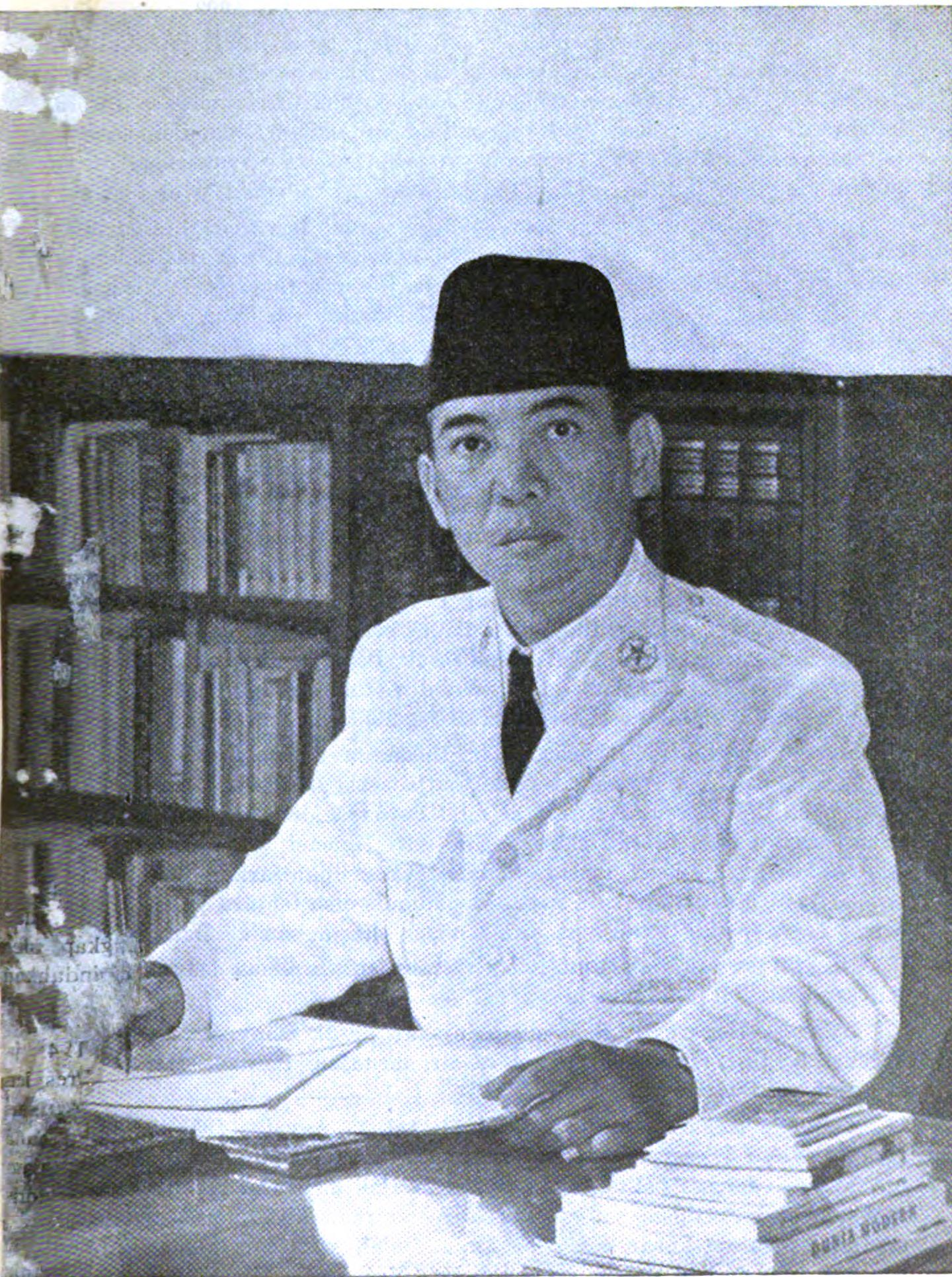
Sukarno was the main adviser to the Javanese Hōkōkai.

The Jawa Hōkōkai (ジャワ奉公会, "Javanese Service Society") was an official organization of the occupation authority and under direct supervision of Japanese officials. The purpose of its establishment was to gather people's energy, both physically and mentally in accordance with Hōkō seishin (奉公精神, "Service spirit"). This "service spirit" focused on the values of self-sacrifice, unity, and obedience. In charge of the association was a representative of the Japanese military government (軍政官, Gunseikan), and Sukarno and Hasyim Asy'ari became its main advisers. The Jawa Hōkōkai was a central organization around which a collection of professional and social associations formed, including the Ishi Hōkōkai (医師奉公会, "Doctors' Service Society"), the Kyōiku Hōkōkai (教育奉公会, "Educators' Service Society"), the Fujinkai (婦人会, "Women's Association") and the Institute for People's Education and Cultural Guidance (啓民文化指導所, Keimin Bunka Shidōsho). The Jawa Hōkōkai was responsible for the mobilization and deployment of goods and individuals that were considered useful for the war effort. Members were youths between the ages of 14 and 22 years old, divided into neighborhood associations of 10 to 20 families.

=== Activities ===
In accordance with its values of self-sacrifice, unity, and obedience to the Japanese, the three basics of the Jawa Hōkōkai were to:

- Do everything with sincerity and with all your might to realize the interests of Japan in the Greater East Asia War.
- Lead the people to donate all their energy, based on a sense of brotherhood among fellow nations.
- Strengthen the Defenders of the Homeland (PETA; Indonesian: Pembela Tanah Air, Japanese: 郷土防衛義勇軍, romanized: Kyōdo Bōei Giyūgun).

In addition to the accommodation of the Japanese and collaborationist militaries, the Jawa Hōkōkai was also tasked with the support of civil organizations in the fields of education and teacher training, culture, and business. The society was also given the task of mobilizing the masses for rice production, mining, collecting scrap, and cultivating jatropha to be handed over to Japan. Any political control exercised by the Jawa Hōkōkai occurred with Japanese guidance and specifically for its own interests.

== Elsewhere ==
The Hōkōkai only developed on the island of Java. On Sumatra, similar societies proved difficult to form, because of its wide variety of ethnic groups, cultures, and languages, making it difficult to create a centralized organization.

Elsewhere in the Indonesian archipelago, social and professional associations only formed at the local level. Native non-Javanese nationalists were deprived of a platform.

== See also ==
- 3A Japanese propaganda movement
- Collaboration with the Empire of Japan
- Japanese occupation of the Dutch East Indies
