= Hadisubeno Sosrowerdojo =

Raden Mas Hadisubeno Sosrowerdojo
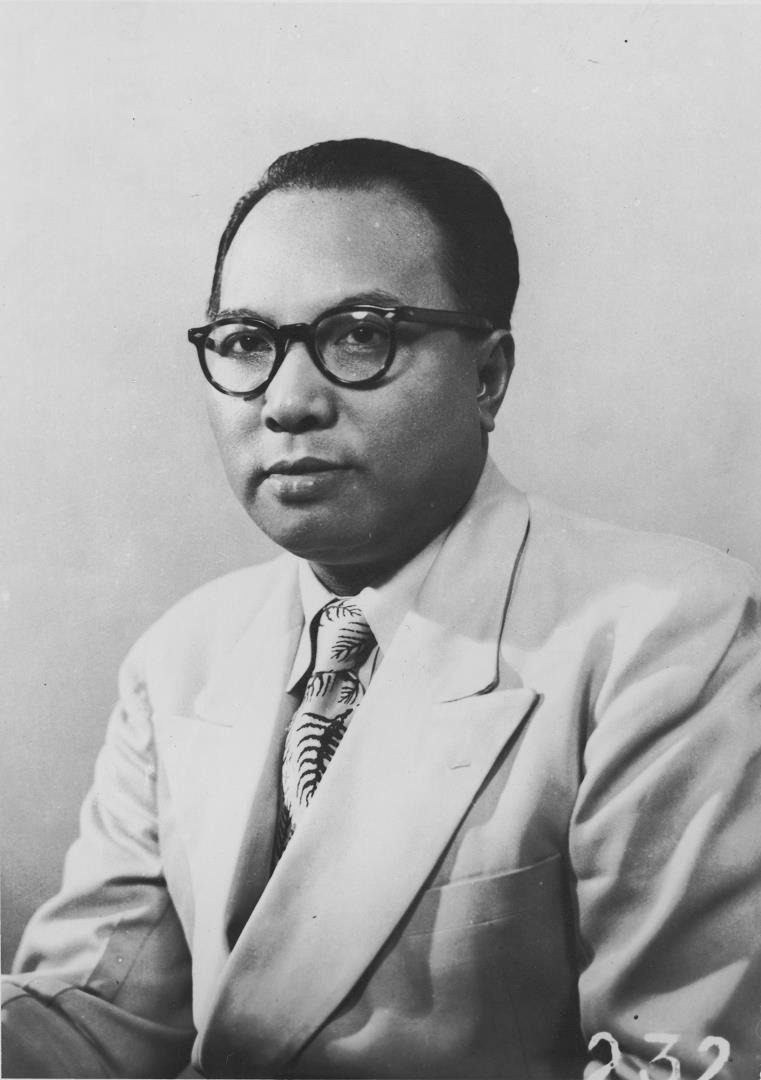
- Portrait, date unknown

Chairman of Indonesian National Party
- In office 12 April 1970 – 24 April 1971
- President: Suharto
- Preceded by: Osa Maliki
- Succeeded by: empty (de facto held by Mohammad Isnaeni)

6th Governor of Central Java
- In office 4 January 1958 – 15 January 1960
- President: Sukarno
- Preceded by: Sukardji Mangun Kusumo
- Succeeded by: Mochtar

3rd Mayor of Semarang
- In office 1 July 1951 – 1 January 1958
- President: Sukarno
- Preceded by: Koesoedibiyono Tjondrowibowo
- Succeeded by: Abdulmadjid Djojoadiningrat

Personal details
- Born: 11 February 1912 Nglorok, Pacitan, Dutch East Indies
- Died: 24 April 1971 (aged 59) Karyadi General Hospital, Semarang, Central Java, Indonesia
- Party: Indonesian National Party
- Spouse: Raden Ayu Kurniah (m. 1939)
- Relations: Suryadi (son-in-law)
- Children: Sri Hartati Wulandari; Sri Kresno Dewantoro; Sri Harni Kusumo; Sajid Sudirotomo

Raden Mas Hadisubeno Sosrowerdojo (11 February 1912 – 24 April 1971) was an Indonesian politician who served as the governor of Central Java from 1958 to 1960 and as the mayor of Semarang from 1951 to 1958. He also served as the last chairman of the Indonesian National Party before it was dissolved into the Indonesian Democratic Party. Hadisubeno was famous for publicly comparing Sukarno and Suharto, and for challenging Suharto rule during his early rule.

== Early life ==
Hadisubeno was born on 11 February 1912, at the town of Nglorok in Pacitan. He was the second of the three sons of Raden Mas Sosrowerdojo, who at the time of his birth served as wedana in Pacitan. His older brother was Sumadijo, while his younger brother was Sempu Mulyono and Sri Mulyo. Sumadijo died during his youth at Belgium, due to a failed operation.

His older brother, Sumadijo, served as the police chief in Cirebon. Once a time, Sumadijo clashed with the resident of Cirebon at that time, van der Plas. Upon the incident, he asked for his resignation and continued to study in Belgium. He refused to study in the Netherlands due to lasting sentiment. Hadisubeno's younger brother, Mulyono, served as the head of the criminal regiment in the Jakarta police, while his youngest brother, Sri Mulyo, died during his youth.

== Family ==
Hadisubeno was married to Raden Ayu Koeniah, a royal descendant from Solo, in 1939. The marriage resulted in 4 children: Sri Hartati Wulandari, born in Solo on 12 June 1940, Sri Kresno Dewantoro, born in Pekalongan on 1 June 1944, Sri Harni Kusumo Djahnawi, born in Solo on 19 December 1947, and Sajid Sudirotomo, born in Semarang on 4 November 1951.

His first daughter, Sri Hartati Wulandari, was a famous Javanese dancer. She married Suryadi, the chairman of the Indonesian Democratic Party, in 1969.
