= List of members of the Indonesian House of Representatives (1950–1956) =

This is a list of members of the Provisional House of Representatives of Indonesia. Following the dissolution of the House of Representatives of the United States of Indonesia, the member of the council automatically became members of the provisional council. In addition, members of the senate and the Supreme Advisory Council also became members of the temporary council, due to the dissolution of both government bodies.

== Speakers and Deputy Speakers ==
Speaker	1st Deputy Speaker	2nd Deputy Speaker	3rd Deputy Speaker
Sartono; PNI	Albert Mangaratua Tambunan; Parkindo	Arudji Kartawinata; PSII	Tadjuddin Noor; PIR

== List ==
Name	Party/Faction	Inauguration	Notes	R
Abdullah Aidit	PKI	16 August 1950	Resigned on 16 June 1954.	
Njoto	PKI	16 August 1954	Replacing Abdullah Aidit.	
Abdullah Jusuf	PNI	16 August 1950		
Abdul Samad	PNI	16 August 1950		
Abdulwahab Chasbullah	NU	9 December 1950		
Abdurrachman Wangsadikarta	Progressive Unity	18 August 1950		
Sutan Muchtar Abidin	Labour Party	21 August 1950	Resigned on 1 December 1954.	
Baheramsjah St. Indra	Labour Party	13 December 1954	Replacing Sutan Muchtar Abidin.	
Aboebakar	Masyumi	18 September 1950		
Abubakar Ariadiningrat	PIR	16 August 1950		
Abulhajat	Progressive Unity	18 August 1950		
Achmad	PIR	-	Resigned on 25 August 1950.	
Zainul Arifin Abidin	PIR	23 February 1954	Replacing Achmad.	
Achmad Sumadi	PKI	22 August 1950		
A.A. Achsien	NU	16 August 1950		
R.S. Adhisukmo	PNI	16 August 1950	Died in office on 6 February 1954.	
Lastari Sutrasno	PNI	27 February 1954	Replacing R.S. Adhisukmo.	
Mohammad Adnan	Independent	16 August 1950		
Ahem Erningpradja	PNI	16 August 1950		
Ahmad Azhary	Masyumi	16 August 1950		
Amelz	Independent	16 August 1950		
Amri Jara	PNI	16 August 1950		
Anak Agung Njoman Pandji Tisna	PRN	21 August 1950	Resigned on 26 May 1951.	
Gde Ngurah Rai	PRN	20 February 1954	Replacing Anak Agung Njoman Pandji Tisna.	
Andi Gappa	Masyumi	16 August 1950		
Andi Lolo	PIR	16 August 1950		
Andi Zainal Abidin	PSI	16 August 1950		
Anwar Tjokroaminoto	PSII	25 August 1950		
Ardiwinangun	Masyumi	16 August 1950		
Arso Sastroatmodjo	Masyumi	16 August 1950		
Arudji Kartawinata	PSII	16 August 1950		
Asrarudin	Labour Party	16 August 1950	Resigned on 15 August 1955.	
Peils Maurits Tangkilisan	Labour Party	7 October 1955	Replacing Asrarudin.	
Assaat	Independent	16 August 1950		
Ateng Kartanahardja	PNI	16 August 1950		
A.S. Bachmid	NU	18 August 1950		
Basri	PSI	16 August 1950		
Abdurrahman Baswedan	Masyumi	16 August 1950		
Bebasa Daeng Lalo	PRN	19 August 1950		
Burhanudin	Independent	16 August 1950		
Burhanuddin Harahap	Masyumi	16 August 1950		
Bustan Urip	PIR (Hazairin)	16 August 1950	Resigned on 24 August 1955.	
Andi Baso Rachim	PIR (Hazairin)	17 October 1955	Replacing Bustan Urip.	
Cyrillus Kersanegara	Parkindo	21 August 1950		
Daljono	Masyumi	21 August 1950		
Daud Beureu'eh	Masyumi	25 October 1950		
Dauhan	PNI	16 August 1950		
Ki Hajar Dewantara	Independent	16 August 1950	Resigned on 31 March 1954.	
Burhanuddin Mohammad Diah	Independent	30 June 1954	Replacing Ki Hadjar Dewantara.	
Djafar Siregar Diapari	SKI	18 September 1950		
Djaetun Dirdjowijoto	PKI	16 August 1950	Resigned on 31 October 1954.	
Bachtaruddin	PKI	30 November 1954	Replacing Djaetun Dirdjowijoto	
Djaidin Purba	PNI	16 August 1950		
Djaswadi Suprapto	PNI	16 August 1950		
Agustinus Jelani	Catholic Party	16 August 1950		
Djerman Prawirawinata	Masyumi	16 August 1950		
Djody Gondokusumo	PRN	16 August 1950	Resigned on 25 November 1954.	
Maridie Danoekoesoema	PRN	9 December 1954	Replacing Djody Gondokusumo.	
Djoeir Mohamad	PSI	16 August 1950		
Ade Mohammad Djohan	PIR	16 August 1950		
Gusti Djohan	Independent	16 August 1950		
Djohan Sjahruzah	PSI	16 August 1950		
Ki Agus Djohar	Masyumi	16 August 1950		
Djokoprawiro	PIR	16 August 1950		
Djokosoedjono	SOBSI	16 August 1950		
Dradjad Partoatmodjo	PNI	16 August 1950		
Emon Bratadiwidjaja	Labour Party	21 August 1950		
Emor Djajadinata	PNI	16 August 1950		
Mohammad Enoch	Parki	16 August 1950	Resigned on 16 May 1951.	
Endon	PNI	16 August 1950		
Mohammad Ersat Trunodjojo	Masyumi	16 August 1950		
Farid Alwi Isa	Masyumi	16 August 1950		
Gondosuwandito	Masyumi	16 August 1950	Died in office on 2 June 1953.	
S. Narto Muljohadipramudji	Masyumi	26 February 1954	Replacing Gondosuwandito.	
Ki Bagus Hadikusumo	Masyumi	18 August 1950	Died in office on 2 September 1954.	
Ali Akbar	Masyumi	5 November 1954	Replacing Ki Bagus Hadikusumo.	
Sukri Hadikusumo	PNI	16 August 1950		
Hamid Algadrie	PSI	16 August 1950		
Hanan	PIR (Hazairin)	16 August 1950	Resigned on 3 October 1955.	
Teuku Teungoh Hanafiah	PIR (Hazairin)	17 October 1955	Replacing R. Hanan.	
Harmani	PIR (Hazairin)	16 August 1950	Died in office on 3 October 1951.	
Husain Puang Limboro	PIR (Hazairin)	23 February 1954	Replacing Harmani.	
Hasan	PNI	16 August 1950		
Hasan Basri	Masyumi	16 August 1950		
Teuku Muhammad Hasan	Independent	16 August 1950		
Helmuth Kunum	SKI	16 August 1950		
Hidajat Prawirodiprodjo	PNI	16 August 1950		
Hindrosudarmo	Masyumi	16 August 1950		
Hutomo Supardan	PKI	16 August 1950		
Ibnutadji Prawirosudirdjo	PNI	16 August 1950		
Ibrahim Sedar	PIR	16 August 1950		
Idham Chalid	NU	16 August 1950		
Muhammad Iljas	NU	25 October 1950	Resigned on 1 October 1955.	
Zainul Arifin	NU	17 October 1955	Replacing Muhammad Iljas.	
Indra Kasuma	Independent	16 August 1950		
Mohammad Isa Anshary	Masyumi	16 August 1950		
Iwa Koesoemasoemantri	Progressive Unity	16 August 1950 20 October 1955	Resigned on 23 November 1954. Replacing Sundoro Budhyarto Martoatmodjo on 20 October 1955.	
Sundoro Budhyarto Martoatmodjo	Progressive Unity	4 December 1954	Replacing Iwa Koesoemasoemantri. Resigned on 1 October 1955.	
Jaman Sudjanaprawira	Independent	7 June 1951		
Mohammad Jamani	PIR	25 September 1951		
Eusebius Jamco	Democratic	16 August 1950		
Bambang Mohammad Jusuf	Labour Party	16 August 1950		
Jusuf Muda Dalam	PNI	16 August 1950		
Muhammad Jusuf Rasjidi	PNI	16 August 1950		
Jusuf Wibisono	Masyumi	16 August 1950		
Kadmirah Karnadidjaja	Parindra	16 August 1950	Died in office on 27 September 1952.	
S. Dipokusumo	Parindra	20 February 1954	Replacing Kadmirah Karnadidjaja.	
Ignatius Joseph Kasimo Hendrowahyono	Catholic Party	16 August 1950	Resigned on 24 August 1955.	
Soewarto	Catholic Party	7 October 1955	Replacing Ignatius Joseph Kasimo.	
Kasman Singodimedjo	Masyumi	16 August 1950		
Kobarsjih	Murba Party	16 August 1950		
Krissubanu	Progressive Unity	16 August 1950		
Kunum Kusumojudo	PNI	18 September 1950		
Rahendra Kusnan	PNI	16 August 1950		
Jacob Langkai	PRN	16 August 1950		
Frits Laoh	PRN	16 August 1950	Resigned on 24 August 1955.	
J.D. Massie	PRN	7 October 1955	Replacing Frits Laoh	
R.C.L. Lasut	Democratic	8 September 1952		
Machmud Latjuba	Masyumi	16 August 1950	Resigned on 10 June 1955	
Mohammad Ismail Napu	Masyumi	20 July 1955	Replacing Machmud Latjuba.	
Johannes Latuharhary	PIR	16 August 1950	Resigned on 1 May 1954.	
Chr. Soplanit	PIR	16 August 1954	Replacing Johannes Latuharhary.	
I.R. Lobo	Progressive Unity	16 August 1950		
Luat Siregar	Progressive Unity	16 August 1950	Died in office on 19 February 1953.	
Buntaran Martoatmodjo	Progressive Unity	20 February 1954	Replacing Luat Siregar.	
Lukman Wiriadinata	PSI	16 August 1950	Resigned on 24 August 1955.	
Noeroelhah	PSI	7 October 1955	Replacing Lukman Wiriadinata.	
Mohammad Machfud	Masyumi	16 August 1950		
Maizir Achmaddyns	Masyumi	16 August 1950		
Manai Sophiaan	PNI	16 August 1950		
Anto Cornelis Manoppo	Democratic	16 August 1950		
Lodevicus Emmanuel Manteiro	Catholic Party	16 August 1950		
Bagioadi Mantjanegara	Masyumi	16 August 1950		
Ida Bagus Putra Manuaba	PNI	16 August 1950		
Margono Djojohadikusumo	Independent	16 August 1950		
Maruto Nitimihardjo	Murba Party	16 August 1950		
J.B.A.F. Mayor Polak	PSI	16 August 1950		
Mochran bin Hadji Ali	Parindra	16 August 1950		
Gusti Abdul Muis	Masyumi	16 August 1950		
Intjik Abdul Muis	PNI	16 August 1950		
Mudikdio	PKI	16 August 1950		
Musirin Sosrosubroto	PKI	16 August 1950		
Mustapha	Labour Party	16 August 1950	Died in office on 25 September 1953.	
Imam Sutardjo	Labour Party	20 February 1954	Replacing Mustapha.	
Mohammad Natsir	Masyumi	16 August 1950		
Nawawi	Parkindo	16 August 1950		
Nerus Ginting Suka	Democratic	16 August 1950	Died in office on 12 February 1955.	
Ngadiman Hardjosubroto	PKI	16 August 1950	Resigned on 16 March 1951.	
D.N. Aidit	PKI	20 February 1954	Replacing Ngadiman Hardjosubroto.	
Ngeradjai Meliala	Democratic	16 August 1950		
Willy Martinus Nieuwenhuysen	PIR	16 August 1950		
Mohammad Noh	Masyumi	16 August 1950		
Pangeran Mohammad Noor	Masyumi	16 August 1950		
Mohammad Nuh	PSI	16 August 1950		
Mohammad Nuh	PIR	16 August 1950		
Mohammad Nur el Ibrahimy	Masyumi	18 September 1950		
Tom Olii	Masyumi	16 August 1950		
Mohammad Padang	Progressive Unity	16 August 1950		
Franciscus Conradus Palaoensoeka	Catholic Party	16 August 1950		
Pandu Kartawiguna	Murba Party	16 August 1950		
Melkias Agustinus Pellaupessy	Democratic	16 August 1950		
Peris Pardede	PKI	16 August 1950		
F.A.P. Pitoi	PIR	16 August 1950		
Petrus Canisius Soemardijo Pranoto	PNI	16 August 1950		
Prawoto Mangkusasmito	Masyumi	16 August 1950		
S. Prawotosudibjo	Masyumi	16 August 1950	Died in office on 21 December 1950.	
Abdurrachman Sjihab	Masyumi	24 March 1954	Replacing S. Prawotosudibjo. Died in office on 7 February 1955.	
E.U. Pupella	PNI	16 August 1950		
Radjiman Wediodiningrat	Progressive Unity	16 August 1950	Died in office on 20 September 1952.	
Silas Papare	Progressive Unity	24 March 1954	Replacing Radjiman Wediodiningrat.	
I Gusti Gde Raka	PRN	16 August 1950	Resigned on 25 November 1954.	
Made Toyasastra	PRN	8 December 1954	Replacing Made Toyasastra. Resigned on 23 August 1955.	
Orang Kaja Ramli	Democratic	16 August 1950		
Rasjid Sutan Radja Emas	PNI	16 August 1950		
Rasuna Said	Independent	16 August 1950		
Anang Abdul Rivai	SKI	16 August 1950		
Alfonsus Rondonuwu	PNI	16 August 1950	Died in office on 14 August 1955.	
Max Maramis	PNI	17 October 1955	Replacing Alfonsus Rondonuwu.	
Otto Rondonuwu	Progressive Unity	16 August 1950		
Alex Rotti	Democratic	16 August 1950		
Mohammad Saad	Masyumi	16 August 1950		
Sabilal Rasjad	PNI	16 August 1950		
Mohammad Saddak	PIR	16 August 1950		
Sahetapy Engel	Democratic	16 August 1950		
Sutan Said Ali	PKI	18 August 1950		
Said Bachreisj	PNI	16 August 1950		
Sakirman	PKI	16 August 1950		
Saleh Umar	PNI	20 November 1950		
S. Sardjono	BTI	16 August 1950		
Sarino Mangunpranoto	PNI	16 August 1950		
Saroso Harsono	PRN	16 August 1950		
Sartono	PNI	16 August 1950		
Sarwono Sastro Sutardjo	PKI	16 August 1950		
Godfried Ronald Schmitz	Catholic Party	16 August 1950		
Ernest Douwes Dekker	Independent	-	Was never sworn in. Died on 28 August 1950.	
J.L.W.R. Rhemrev	Masyumi	11 November 1954	Replacing Danoedirdja Setiaboedi.	
Siauw Giok Tjhan	SKI	16 August 1950		
Sidik Djojosukarto	PNI	16 August 1950	Died in office on 8 September 1955.	
Sunario	PNI	17 October 1955.	Replacing Sidik Djojosukarto.	
Sidik Kertapati	Progressive Unity	18 August 1950		
Hadrianus Sinaga	Parkindo	16 August 1950	Resigned on 6 October 1954.	
Saladin Sarumpaet	Parkindo	8 December 1954	Replacing Hadrianus Sinaga.	
Philemon Sinaga	Democratic	16 August 1950		
Siradjuddin Abbas	Perti	18 August 1950	Resigned on 19 November 1954.	
Rusli Abdul Wahid	Perti	9 December 1954	Replacing Siradjuddin Abbas.	
Mohammad Sjafei	Independent	18 November 1950		
Sjamsuddin Sutan Makmur	Independent	16 August 1950	Resigned on 12 August 1955.	
Moestafa Kamil Oesman	PIR	7 October 1955	Replacing Sjamsuddin Sutan Makmur.	
Slamet Tirtosubroto	PNI	16 August 1950		
Johan Paul Snel	PRN	16 August 1950		
Sonda Daeng Matajang	PRN	18 August 1950		
Kaharkusmen Sosrodanukusumo	Masyumi	16 August 1950		
Subadio Sastrosatomo	PSI	16 August 1950		
Sudarnadi	PIR	16 August 1950		
Sudarso	PNI	16 August 1950		
Sudijono Djojoprajitno	Murba Party	21 August 1950		
Valentinus Sudjito	Catholic Party	16 August 1950		
Sugih Tjokrosumarto	Parindra	16 August 1950		
Agustinus Suhardi	Catholic Party	21 August 1950	Resigned on 1 February 1955.	
M.J. Oentoe	Catholic Party	1 April 1955	Replacing Agustinus Suhardi.	
Suhardjo	PSII	16 August 1950		
Soejadi	Independent	16 August 1950	Died in office on 23 November 1953.	
Boedisoesetyo	PIR	24 February 1954	Replacing Soejadi.	
Sujono Hadinoto	PNI	16 August 1950		
Soekiman Wirjosandjojo	Masyumi	16 August 1950		
Sulaiman Dzen	PIR	16 August 1950		
Sumanang Surjowinoto	PNI	16 August 1950	Resigned on 13 March 1954.	
Soebagio Reksodipoero	PNI	14 April 1954	Replacing Sumanang Surjowinoto.	
Sumardi	PKI	22 August 1950	Resigned on 22 July 1954.	
Muhammad Hatta Lukman	PKI	16 August 1954	Replacing Sumardi.	
Sumarto	Parkindo	16 August 1950		
Sumartojo	PSI	16 August 1950		
Sunardi Adiwirjono	PKI	21 August 1950		
Sunario	PNI	16 August 1950	Resigned on 22 November 1954.	
Chairuddin Sjahadat	PNI	4 December 1954	Replacing Sunario.	
Sunarjati Sukemi	PSI	16 August 1950		
Sunarjo Mangunpuspito	Masyumi	16 August 1950		

== Bibliography ==
- Tim Penyusun Sejarah (1970), Seperempat Abad Dewan Perwakilan Rakyat Republik Indonesia [A Quarter Century of the House of Representatives of the Republic of Indonesia] (PDF) (in Indonesian), Jakarta: Sekretariat DPR-GR
