= Dayaks in politics =

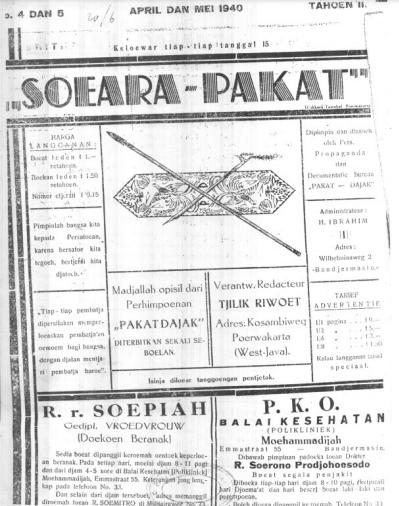
Soeara Pakat, a newspaper published by the Dayak political organization Pakat Dajak

Dayak in politics refers to the participation of Dayaks to represent their political ideas and interests outside of their community. The movement has continued to have a profound impact on the development of Indonesia and Malaysia, especially in Kalimantan and Sarawak.

== Kalimantan ==
=== Early movements ===
The rise of educated Dayak intellectuals in Kalimantan during early 1900s was attributed to education given by missionary missions in the Kalimantan interior. Missionary education served as alternative for Dayak youths to Dutch formal schools that were relatively expensive and discriminative in nature. Previously, Dayaks, particularly Ngaju people, had traditional education institution known as Kuwu, which focused on knowledge of tribal laws, oral traditions, and traditional medicine. This system however, was reserved for aristocrat group within the tribe known as Utus Gantung and not open for public. The Kuwu system gradually declined by 1823, as missionary activities became more prominent since presence of German missionary named Branstein. The rise of missionary education, however, was not linear with conversion rate. Missionary schools such as those by J.F Becker in 1940 had hundreds of Dayak students, but only 13 people converted to Christianity and mostly retained their Hindu folk religion Kaharingan. Many Dayak families were more interested in the education opportunity for their own cause rather than religious cause of the missionary itself.

Organised Dayak political representation in the Kalimantan first appeared during the Dutch administration. The feudal Sultanates of Kutai, Banjar, and Pontianak figured prominently prior to the rise of the Dutch colonial rule. This changed following Tumbang Anoi Agreement of 1894, where many representative of Dayaks gathered and renounced any tribal warfare tradition. Dayaks in the Indonesian side actively organised under various associations beginning with the Dayak League (Sarekat Dayak) established in 1919 in Banjarmasin, to the Partai Dayak in the 1940s, which serves as an early Pan-Dayakism in Indonesia and to the present day, where Dayaks occupy key positions in government. Early Pan-Dayakism sentiment to unite hundreds of Dayak sub-ethnics later influenced by the rise of Indonesian nationalism and as such often got mixed together.

Early Dayak figure Hausman Baboe, a Dayak journalist who managed newspaper Soeara Pakat and later also worked on newspaper Sinar Borneo, was a friend of prominent Indonesian nationalist Oemar Said Tjokroaminoto. He was a district chief of Kuala Kapuas in 1919 after previously was focusing solely on journalism since 1905 and later worked on a Kalimantan magazine Barita Bahalap.

Another Dayak figure, George Obus, who was also educated by missionary, later continued his education to Surabaya and found Persatuan Pemuda Kalimantan (Kalimantan Youth Unity) or PPK. George Obus later became representative of Dayak during Youth Pledge in October 1928. He was also invited by Indonesische Studie Club to form Partai Persatuan Bangsa Indonesia (Indonesian Nation Unity Party) or PBI in June 1928 and later became member of the party. The party was led by Soetomo and later the party became known as Parindra and among the most active Indonesian party in Volksraad.

=== World War II and Indonesian National Revolution ===
The violent massacre of the Malay sultans, local rulers, intellectuals, and politicians by the Imperial Japanese Army during the Pontianak incidents of 1943–1944 in West Borneo (present-day West Kalimantan province) created a social opportunity for the Dayak people in the West Kalimantan political and administrative system during the Orde Lama era of Sukarno, as a generation of predominantly Malay administrator in West Borneo was lost during the genocide perpetrated by the Japanese. The Dayak ruling elite was mostly left unscratched due to the fact that they were then mainly located in the hinterland and because the Japanese were not interested aside of Dayak Desa War, thus giving an advantage for the Dayak leaders to fill the administrative and political position after the Indonesian independence.

=== Post-independence ===
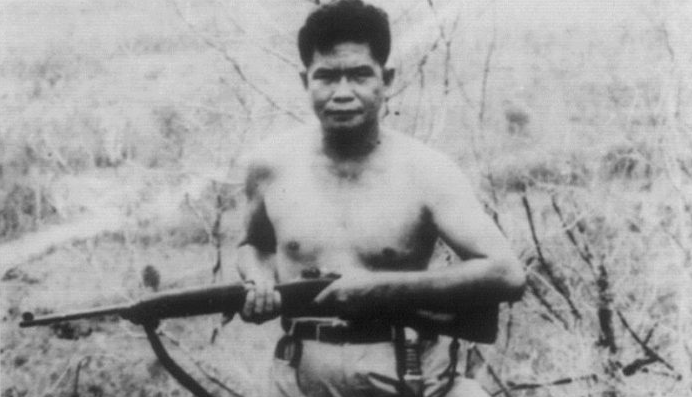
Central Kalimantan Governor Tjilik Riwut, pictured fighting in the Kalimantan mountains, c. 1940's

The creation of Central Kalimantan province was pushed by Dayak militia Mandau Talawang Pancasila. The militia also on the other hand helped government to fight Islamist rebellion in South Kalimantan.

In the 1955 Indonesian Constituent Assembly election, the Dayak Unity Party managed to gain:

- 146,054 votes (0.4% of the nationwide vote)
  - One seat in the People's Representative Council from West Kalimantan
- 33.1% of the votes in West Kalimantan (becoming the second largest political party after Masjumi)
  - the party attained 9 out of 29 seats in the West Kalimantan People's Representative Council.
- 1.5% votes in Central Kalimantan (the party managed to obtain 6.9% of the vote in the Dayak-majority areas in the province)

The party was later disbanded after an order by the then-president Sukarno that prohibited an ethnic-based party. The members of the party were then continued their careers in other political parties. Oevaang Oerey joined the Indonesian Party (Partai Indonesia), whilst some others joined the Catholic Party (Partai Katolik).

Among the most prominent Indonesian Dayak politician is Tjilik Riwut, a member of the Central Indonesian National Committee, he was honoured as the National Hero of Indonesia in 1998 for his major contribution during the Indonesian National Revolution in Kalimantan. He had served as the Central Kalimantan Governor between 1958 and 1967. While in 1960, Oevaang Oeray was appointed as the 3rd Governor of West Kalimantan, becoming the first governor of Dayak origin in the province. He held the office until 1966. He is also known as one of the founding fathers of the Dayak Unity Party in 1945 and had been actively assisting the Brunei Revolt in 1962 during the height of the Indonesia–Malaysia confrontation.

Under Indonesia, Kalimantan is now divided into five self-autonomous provinces i.e. North, West, East, South, and Central Kalimantan. Under Indonesia's transmigration programme, which was initiated by the Dutch in 1905, settlers from densely populated Java and Madura were encouraged to settle in the Indonesian provinces of Borneo. The large-scale transmigration projects continued following Indonesian independence, causing social strains. In 2001 the Indonesian government ended the transmigration of Javanese settlement of Indonesian Borneo. During the killings of 1965–66 Dayaks killed up to 5,000 Chinese and forced survivors to flee to the coast and camps. Starvation killed thousands of Chinese children who were under eight years old. The Chinese refused to fight back since they considered themselves "a guest on other people's land" with the intention of trading only. 75,000 of the Chinese who survived were displaced, fleeing to camps where they were detained in coastal cities. The Dayak leaders were interested in cleansing the entire area of ethnic Chinese. In Pontianak, 25,000 Chinese living in dirty, filthy conditions were stranded. They had to take baths in the mud. The massacres are considered a "dark chapter in recent Dayak history".

From 1996 to 2003 there were violent attacks on Indonesian Madurese settlers, including executions of Madurese transmigrant communities. The violence included the 1999 Sambas riots and the Sampit conflict in 2001 in which more than 500 were killed that year. Indonesian military and local politician was instead, supportive of Dayak cause and many Dayak figures use the violence for political cause.

Dayak in Indonesia has legal cultural organization which is National Dayak Customary Council (Dewan Adat Dayak). It has local branches in regencies and cities down to villages, recognized by local government laws, and has a paramilitary wing, Batamad. It enjoys relatively high support from government including close ties to Indonesian military.

== Sarawak ==
=== Brooke Rajah dominion ===
The Dayak's political representation in Sarawak compare very poorly with their organised brethren in the Indonesian side of Borneo, partly due to the personal fiefdom that was the Brooke Rajah dominion, and possibly to the pattern of their historical migrations from the Indonesian part to the then pristine Rajang Basin. Reconstituted into British crown colony after the end of Japanese occupation in World War II, Sarawak obtained independence from the British on 22 July 1963, alongside Sabah (North Borneo) on 31 August 1963, and would join the Federation of Malaya and Singapore to form the Federation of Malaysia on 16 September 1963 under the belief of being equal partners in the "marriage" as per the 18 and 20-point agreements and the Malaysia Agreement of 1963.

==== Post-independence Sarawak ====
Dayak political activism in Sarawak had its roots in the Sarawak National Party (SNAP) and Parti Pesaka Anak Sarawak (PESAKA) during post-independence construction in the 1960s. These parties shaped to a certain extent Dayak politics in the state, although never enjoying the real privileges and benefits of Chief Ministerial power relative to its large electorate due to their own political disunity with some Dayaks joining various political parties instead of consolidating inside one single political party.

The first Sarawak Chief Minister was Datuk Stephen Kalong Ningkan, who was removed as the chief minister in 1966 after court proceedings and amendments to both the Sarawak state constitution and the Malaysian federal constitution due to some disagreements with regards to the 18-point Agreement as conditions for the formation of Malaysia. Datuk Penghulu Tawi Sli was appointed as the second Sarawak chief minister who was a soft-spoken seat-warmer fellow and then replaced by Tuanku Abdul Rahman Ya'kub (a Melanau Muslim) as the third Sarawak chief minister in 1970 who in turn was succeeded by Abdul Taib Mahmud (a Melanau Muslim) in 1981 as fourth Sarawak chief minister. After Taib Mahmud resigned on 28 February 2014 to become the next Sarawak's governor, he appointed his brother-in-law, Adenan Satem, as the next Sarawak Chief Minister, who has in turn been succeeded by Abang Johari Openg in 2017.

A wave of Dayakism which is Dayak nationalism has surfaced at least thrice among the Dayaks in Sarawak while they are on the opposition side of politics as follows:

- Sarawak Alliance made up of SNAP and PESAKA managed to win the Sarawak Local Council Election in 1963 over the opposition pact of SUPP and PANAS, proceeding to make Stephen Kalong Ningkan as the first Sarawak Chief Minister and signing up of the Malaysia Agreement at London in 1963.
- SNAP won 18 seats (with 42.70% popular vote) out of a total of 48 seats in Sarawak state election, 1974 while the remaining 30 seats were won by Sarawak National Front. This resulted in the first Iban becoming the Opposition Leader in the Malaysian Parliament i.e. Datuk Sri Edmund Langgu being the leading Iban MP from SNAP with the SNAP president James Wong being detained under the Internal Security Act (ISA).
- PBDS (Parti Bansa Dayak Sarawak), a breakaway of SNAP in Sarawak state election in 1987 won 15 seats while its partner Permas only won 5 seats. Overall, the Sarawak National Front won 28 constituencies with PBB 14; SUPP 11 and SNAP 3. In both cases, SNAP and PBDS (both parties are now defunct) have joined the Malaysian National Front as the ruling coalition.

== See also ==
- Mina Susana Setra
