= List of members of the House of Representatives of the United States of Indonesia =

This is a list of members of the House of Representatives of the United States of Indonesia. The legislature existed only for a brief period during the existence of the federal state, and had 151 members, based on the amount of each constituent state. The largest state, the Republic of Indonesia, has 50 members, while smaller states such as Bangka, Belitung, Riau, Great Dayak, Southeast Borneo, and East Kalimantan, has only two members.

In addition to the states, there were also representatives of two cities, Sabang and Kotawaringin, each having one member in the council. European minorities were also represented in the council with four members.

Unless stated, all members were inaugurated on 17 February 1950.

== Speakers and Deputy Speakers ==
Speaker	1st Deputy Speaker	2nd Deputy Speaker
Sartono; Republic of Indonesia	Albert Mangaratua Tambunan; Republic of Indonesia	Arudji Kartawinata; Republic of Indonesia

== List ==
State	Name	Notes	R
Republic of Indonesia	Abdullah Jusuf		
Republic of Indonesia	Ahem Erningpradja		
Republic of Indonesia	Arudji Kartawinata	Elected as the Second Deputy Speaker.	
Republic of Indonesia	Amelz		
Republic of Indonesia	Amri Jara		
Republic of Indonesia	Basri		
Republic of Indonesia	Benjamin	Died on 4 July 1950.	
Republic of Indonesia	Ki Bagus Hadikusumo	Replacing Benjamin, was never inaugurated.	
Republic of Indonesia	Goesti Abdul Moeis		
Republic of Indonesia	Hamid Algadrie		
Republic of Indonesia	Iwa Kusuma Sumantri		
Republic of Indonesia	Jusuf Muda Dalam		
Republic of Indonesia	Jusuf Wibisono	Inaugurated on 3 April 1950.	
Republic of Indonesia	Ignatius Joseph Kasimo		
Republic of Indonesia	Rahendra Kusnan		
Republic of Indonesia	Johannes Latuharhary		
Republic of Indonesia	I. R. Lobo		
Republic of Indonesia	Lukman Wiriadinata		
Republic of Indonesia	Manai Sophiaan		
Republic of Indonesia	Maruto Nitimihardjo		
Republic of Indonesia	Mohammad Daljono		
Republic of Indonesia	Mohammad Natsir		
Republic of Indonesia	Mohammad Noer El Ibrahimy		
Republic of Indonesia	Mohammad Padang		
Republic of Indonesia	Mohammad Tauchid		
Republic of Indonesia	Moedikdio		
Republic of Indonesia	Muhammad Yamin		
Republic of Indonesia	Mustafa		
Republic of Indonesia	Ngadiman Hardjosubroto		
Republic of Indonesia	Peris Pardede		
Republic of Indonesia	Otto Rondonuwu		
Republic of Indonesia	Sutan Said Ali		
Republic of Indonesia	Sakirman		
Republic of Indonesia	Saleh Umar	Was never inaugurated.	
Republic of Indonesia	Sartono	Elected as the Speaker.	
Republic of Indonesia	Sarwono Sastro Sutardjo		
Republic of Indonesia	Siauw Giok Tjhan		
Republic of Indonesia	Hadrianus Sinaga		
Republic of Indonesia	Siradjuddin Abbas		
Republic of Indonesia	Subadio Sastrosutomo		
Republic of Indonesia	Sujono Hadinoto		
Republic of Indonesia	Sukiman Wirjosandjojo		
Republic of Indonesia	Soenarjati Soekemi		
Republic of Indonesia	Suwarti		
Republic of Indonesia	Albert Mangaratua Tambunan	Elected as the First Deputy Speaker.	
Republic of Indonesia	Adjidarmo Tjokronegoro		
Republic of Indonesia	Tjikwan		
Republic of Indonesia	Werdojo		
Republic of Indonesia	Yap Tjwan Bing		
Republic of Indonesia	Yunan Nasution		
Republic of Indonesia	Zainal Abidin Ahmad		
East Indonesia	Andi Gappa		
East Indonesia	Ahmad Duna Andilolo		
East Indonesia	Ahmad Sjechan Bachmid		
East Indonesia	Gustaf Ernst Dauhan		
East Indonesia	Eusebius Jamco	Inaugurated on 24 February 1950.	
East Indonesia	R. C. Lasut	Inaugurated on 2 March 1950.	
East Indonesia	Anto Cornelis Manoppo		
East Indonesia	Ida Bagus Putra Manuaba	Inaugurated on 2 March 1950.	
East Indonesia	Lodevicus Emmanuel Manteiro	Inaugurated on 25 February 1950.	
East Indonesia	Tom Olii	Inaugurated on 25 February 1950.	
East Indonesia	F.A.P. Pitoi		
East Indonesia	E.U. Pupella		
East Indonesia	Alex Rotti		
East Indonesia	Benjamin Sahetapy Engel		
East Indonesia	Sonda Daeng Mattajang		
East Indonesia	Teng Tjin Leng		
East Indonesia	Antoinette Waroh	Inaugurated on 20 March 1950.	
Pasundan	Abdurachman Wangsadikarta	Was never inaugurated. Membership cancelled on 14 February 1950.	
Pasundan	Abulhajat	Was never inaugurated. Membership cancelled on 14 February 1950.	
Pasundan	Achmad Sumadi	Was never inaugurated. Membership cancelled on 14 February 1950.	
Pasundan	A.A. Achsien	Was never inaugurated. Membership cancelled on 14 February 1950.	
Pasundan	Anwar Tjokroaminoto	Was never inaugurated. Membership cancelled on 14 February 1950.	
Pasundan	Djerman Prawirawinata	Was never inaugurated. Membership cancelled on 14 February 1950.	
Pasundan	Emon Bratadiwidjaja	Was never inaugurated. Membership cancelled on 14 February 1950.	
Pasundan	Jaman Sudjana Prawira	Was never inaugurated. Membership cancelled on 14 February 1950.	
Pasundan	Kadmirah Karnadidjaja	Was never inaugurated. Membership cancelled on 14 February 1950.	
Pasundan	Mohammad Isa Anshary	Was never inaugurated. Membership cancelled on 14 February 1950.	
Pasundan	Musirin Sosrosubroto	Was never inaugurated. Membership cancelled on 14 February 1950.	
Pasundan	Nawawi	Was never inaugurated. Membership cancelled on 14 February 1950.	
Pasundan	Pandu Kartawiguna	Was never inaugurated. Membership cancelled on 14 February 1950.	
Pasundan	Sidik Kartapati	Was never inaugurated. Membership cancelled on 14 February 1950.	
Pasundan	Sumardi	Was never inaugurated. Membership cancelled on 14 February 1950.	
Pasundan	Sunario	Was never inaugurated. Membership cancelled on 14 February 1950.	
Pasundan	Suparno	Was never inaugurated. Membership cancelled on 14 February 1950.	
Pasundan	Hubertus Sutarto Hadisudibjo	Was never inaugurated. Membership cancelled on 14 February 1950.	
Pasundan	Wardi Kusnatalistra	Was never inaugurated. Membership cancelled on 14 February 1950.	
East Java	Ateng Kartanahardja		
East Java	Arso Sosroatmodjo		
East Java	W. Augustin	Withdrew on 16 April 1950.	
East Java	Djaswadi Saprapto		
East Java	Dradjad Partoatmodjo		
East Java	Indra Kasuma	Inaugurated on 7 August 1950.	
East Java	Farid Alwi Isa		
East Java	Jacob Langkai		
East Java	Petrus Canisius Soemardijo Pranoto	Inaugurated on 24 July 1950.	
East Java	Said Bahreisj		
East Java	Saroso Harsono		
East Java	M. Sudarmadi		
East Java	Surjaningprodjo		
East Java	Tan Boen Aan		
East Java	Tjoa Sie Hwie		
Madura	Bagioadi Mantjanegara		
Madura	Kaharkusmen Sosrodanukusumo		
Madura	Mohammad Ersat Trunodjojo		
Madura	Mohammad Machfud		
Madura	Mohammad Zainal Alim		
East Sumatra	Nerus Ginting Suka		
East Sumatra	Muhammad Nuh		
East Sumatra	Orang Kaja Ramli		
East Sumatra	Philemon Sinaga		
South Sumatra	Ahmad Azhary		
South Sumatra	Mohammad Hasan		
South Sumatra	Mohammad Nuh		
South Sumatra	Mohammad Sadak		
Central Java	S.Adhisukmo		
Central Java	Emor Djajadinata		
Central Java	Endon		
Central Java	Hidajat Prawirodiprodjo		
Central Java	Ibnutadji Prawirosudirdjo		
Central Java	Mohammad Ilyas		
Central Java	S.Prawoto Sudibjo		
Central Java	Alfonsus Rondonuwu		
Central Java	Slamet Tirtosubroto		
Central Java	Sugih Tjokrosumarto		
Central Java	S. Hadiwibowo Trenggono		
Central Java	Theodorus van der Lee	Was never inaugurated. Never handed out his credentials and his proof of citizenship.	
Bangka	Abdul Samad		
Bangka	Muhammad Jusuf Rasjidi		
Belitung	Abdullah Aidit		
Belitung	Agus Djohar		
Riau	Achmad		
Riau	Mohammad Noer	Inaugurated on 24 February 1950. Died on 21 May 1950.	
West Kalimantan	Ade Mohammad Djohan		
West Kalimantan	Franciscus Conradus Palaunsoeka		
West Kalimantan	M.Sudarso		
West Kalimantan	Tjoeng Lin Sen		
Great Dayak	Cyrillus Kersanegara	Was never inaugurated.	
Great Dayak	E.Kunum Kusumojudo		
Banjar	Djafar Siregar Diapari	Inaugurated on 22 March 1950.	
Banjar	Idham Chalid	Inaugurated on 22 March 1950.	
Banjar	Hasan Basri	Inaugurated on 22 March 1950.	
Southeast Borneo	Andi Zainal Abidin		
Southeast Borneo	Gusti Djohan		
East Kalimantan	Intjik Abdul Muis		
East Kalimantan	Rasjid Sutan Radja Emas		
Sabang	Mohammad Yatim Jacin	Inaugurated on 22 March 1950.	
Kotawaringin	Ibrahim Sedar	Inaugurated on 22 March 1950.	
European Minority	Johan Bernard Abraham Fortunatus Mayor Polak	Inaugurated on 5 April 1950.	
European Minority	Godfried Ronald Schmitz	Inaugurated on 6 March 1950.	
European Minority	Johan Paul Snel	Inaugurated on 6 March 1950.	
European Minority	Willy Martinus Nieuwenhuysen	Inaugurated on 23 May 1950.	

== Bibliography ==
- Tim Penyusun Sejarah (1970), Seperempat Abad Dewan Perwakilan Rakyat Republik Indonesia [A Quarter Century of the People's Representative Council of the Republic of Indonesia] (PDF) (in Indonesian), Jakarta: Sekretariat DPR-GR
