= List of members of the Senate of the United States of Indonesia =

This is a list of members of the Senate of the United States of Indonesia. The legislature existed only for a brief period during the existence of the federal state, and had 32 members, two from each constituent state.

== Speakers and Deputy Speakers ==
Speaker	Deputy Speaker
Melkias Agustinus Pellaupessy; East Indonesia	Teuku Muhammad Hasan; Republic of Indonesia

== List ==
State	Image	Name	Born	Political affiliation	Notes
Republic of Indonesia		Sumanang	1 May 1908	Indonesian National Party	
Republic of Indonesia		Teuku Muhammad Hasan	4 April 1906	Independent	Elected as the Deputy Speaker
East Indonesia		Muhammad Kaharuddin III	1902	Independent	Withdrew from the senate.
East Indonesia		Melkias Agustinus Pellaupessy	25 May 1906	Democratic	Elected as the Speaker.
Pasundan		Mohammad Enoch	17 February 1893	Indonesian National Party	
Pasundan		M. Ardiwinangun	14 April 1900	Masyumi	
East Java		Roeslan Wongsokoesoemo	?	Indonesian National Party	Withdrew from the senate.
East Java		Soejadi	1 January 1888	Independent	
Madura		M. Gondosuwandito	?	Masyumi	
Madura		R. Abdurrasid	?	Indonesian National Party	Withdrew from the senate.
East Sumatra		Djaidin Purba	1 May 1906	Indonesian National Party	
East Sumatra		Ngeradjai Meliala	26 November 1913	Democratic	
South Sumatra		Raden Hanan	5 November 1898	Great Indonesia Unity Party	Installed on 20 February 1950.
South Sumatra		Bustan Urip	12 May 1899	Great Indonesia Unity Party	
Central Java		Valentinus Sudjito	13 February 1905	Catholic Party	
Central Java		Sarino Mangunpranoto	15 January 1911	Indonesian National Party	
Bangka		Sulaiman Dzen	12 February 1901	Great Indonesia Unity Party	
Bangka		Tjung Tin Jan	9 February 1919	Catholic Party	
Belitung		Abubakar	2 May 1903	Masyumi	
Belitung		Mohamad Saad	15 November 1915	Masyumi	
Riau		Mohamad Noh	25 December 1908	Masyumi	
Riau		Machmud	15 February 1898	Independent	Withdrew from the senate.
West Kalimantan		Agustinus Jelani	28 August 1919	Catholic Party	
West Kalimantan		Abubakar Ariadiningrat	6 April 1915	Great Indonesia Unity Party	
Great Dayak		Mochran bin Hadji Ali	31 March 1908	Parindra	
Great Dayak		Helmuth Kunum	15 March 1915	SKI	
Banjar		Anang Abdul Rivai	8 September 1913	SKI	Installed on 5 March 1950. Replacing H. Raden.
Banjar		Burhanudin	20 September 1909	Independent	
Southeast Borneo		Tadjuddin Noor	16 April 1906	Great Indonesia Unity Party	
Southeast Borneo		Mohammad Jamani	2 May 1915	Great Indonesia Unity Party	
East Kalimantan		Adji Raden Djokoprawiro	15 August 1915	Great Indonesia Unity Party	
East Kalimantan		Adji Bambang Mohammad Jusuf	10 June 1910	Labour Party	

== Bibliography ==
- Tim Penyusun Sejarah (1970), Seperempat Abad Dewan Perwakilan Rakjat Republik Indonesia [A Quarter Century of the People's Representative Council of the Republic of Indonesia] (PDF) (in Indonesian), Jakarta: Sekretariat DPR-GR
