= List of longest-serving members of the Parliament of Indonesia =

This article lists the longest-serving members of the Parliament of Indonesia.

== Longest total service ==
This section lists members of parliament who have served for a cumulative total of at least 25 years.

All these periods of service were spent in one House exclusively. A number of people have served in People's Representative Council (DPR), Constitutional Assembly of Indonesia (MPR), Constitutional Assembly of Indonesia (Konstituante) and Regional Representative Council.

Portrait	Name	Party	Chamber(s)	Start of service	End of service	Period of service	Ref.
	Franciscus Conradus Palaoensoeka	PPD	DPR	16 August 1950	25 June 1960	37 years, 223 days	
	Franciscus Conradus Palaoensoeka	Catholic	DPR	25 June 1960	11 January 1973	37 years, 223 days	
	Franciscus Conradus Palaoensoeka	PDI	DPR	11 January 1973	26 March 1988	37 years, 223 days	
	Muhidin Mohamad Said	Independent	MPR	1 October 1992	1 October 2004	33 years, 57 days (Note: Per 27 November 2025)	
	Muhidin Mohamad Said	Golkar	DPR	1 October 2004	Incumbent	33 years, 57 days	
	Abdullah Zainie	Golkar	DPR	28 October 1971	1 October 1997	30 years, 338 days	
	Abdullah Zainie	Golkar	DPR	1 October 1999	1 October 2004	30 years, 338 days	
	Imam Churmen	PPP	DPR	28 October 1971	1 October 1997	30 years, 338 days	
	Imam Churmen	PKB	DPR	1 October 1999	1 October 2004	30 years, 338 days	
	Guruh Sukarnoputra	PDI	DPR	1 October 1992	1 October 1997	30 years, 0 days	
	Guruh Sukarnoputra	PDIP	DPR	1 October 1999	1 October 2024	30 years, 0 days	
	Aisyah Aminy	Independent	DPR	1 February 1967	22 May 1969	29 years, 110 days	
	Aisyah Aminy	Independent	MPR	1 October 1977	1 October 1987	29 years, 110 days	
	Aisyah Aminy	PPP	DPR	1 October 1987	1 October 2004	29 years, 110 days	
	Ismail Hasan Metareum	NU	DPR	28 October 1971	5 January 1973	27 years, 338 days	
	Ismail Hasan Metareum	PPP	DPR	5 January 1973	1 October 1999	27 years, 338 days	
	Agun Gunandjar Sudarsa	Golkar	DPR	1 October 1997	Incumbent	28 years, 57 days	
	Hamzah Haz	NU	DPR	28 October 1971	5 January 1973	26 years, 236 days	
	Hamzah Haz	PPP	DPR	5 January 1973	23 May 1998	26 years, 236 days	
	Hamzah Haz	PPP	DPR	1 October 1999	29 October 1999	26 years, 236 days	
	Masjkur	NU	DPR	26 March 1956	5 January 1973	26 years, 189 days	
	Masjkur	PPP	DPR	5 January 1973	1 October 1982	26 years, 189 days	
	Pamudji	PNI	DPR	26 March 1956	5 June 1960	26 years, 32 days	
	Pamudji	PNI	DPR	15 November 1965	11 January 1973	26 years, 32 days	
	Pamudji	PDI	DPR	11 January 1973	1 October 1987	26 years, 32 days	
	Sabam Sirait	Parkindo	DPR	17 May 1966	28 October 1971	26 years, 25 days	
	Sabam Sirait	PDI	DPR	1 October 1977	1 October 1982	26 years, 25 days	
	Sabam Sirait	PDI	DPR	1 October 1992	1 October 1997	26 years, 25 days	
	Sabam Sirait	PDIP	DPR	1 October 1999	1 October 2004	26 years, 25 days	
	Sabam Sirait	PDIP	DPR	1 October 2005	1 October 2009	26 years, 25 days	
	Sabam Sirait	Independent	DPD	15 January 2018	29 September 2021	26 years, 25 days	
	Soenarjo Haddade	Golkar	DPR	28 October 1971	1 October 1997	25 years, 338 days	
	Novyan Kaman	Golkar	DPR	28 October 1971	1 October 1997	25 years, 338 days	
	Aloysius Aloy	Golkar	DPR	28 October 1971	1 October 1997	25 years, 338 days	
	Andi Mochtar	Golkar	DPR	28 October 1971	1 October 1997	25 years, 338 days	
	Anak Agung Oka Mahendra	Golkar	DPR	28 October 1971	1 October 1997	25 years, 338 days	
	Soerjadi	PNI	DPR	1 October 1971	11 January 1973	25 years, 338 days	
	Soerjadi	PDI	DPR	11 January 1973	1 October 1997	25 years, 338 days	
	Notosukardjo	PNI	DPR	26 March 1956	5 June 1960	25 years, 214 days	
	Notosukardjo	PNI	DPR	17 May 1966	11 January 1973	25 years, 214 days	
	Notosukardjo	PDI	DPR	11 January 1973	1 October 1987	25 years, 214 days	
	Ferdiansyah	Golkar	DPR	1 October 1999	Incumbent	26 years, 57 days	
	Melchias Marcus Mekeng	Independent	MPR	1 October 1999	1 October 2004	26 years, 57 days	
	Melchias Marcus Mekeng	Golkar	DPR	1 October 2004	Incumbent	26 years, 57 days	
	I Made Urip	PDIP	DPR	1 October 1999	1 October 2024	25 years, 0 days	
	Mindo Sianipar	PDIP	DPR	1 October 1999	1 October 2024	25 years, 0 days	
	Jakob S. Tobing	Golkar	DPR	1 October 1977	1 October 1997	25 years, 0 days	
	Jakob S. Tobing	PDIP	DPR	1 October 1999	1 October 2004	25 years, 0 days	
