= Tadjuddin Noor =

Indonesian politician

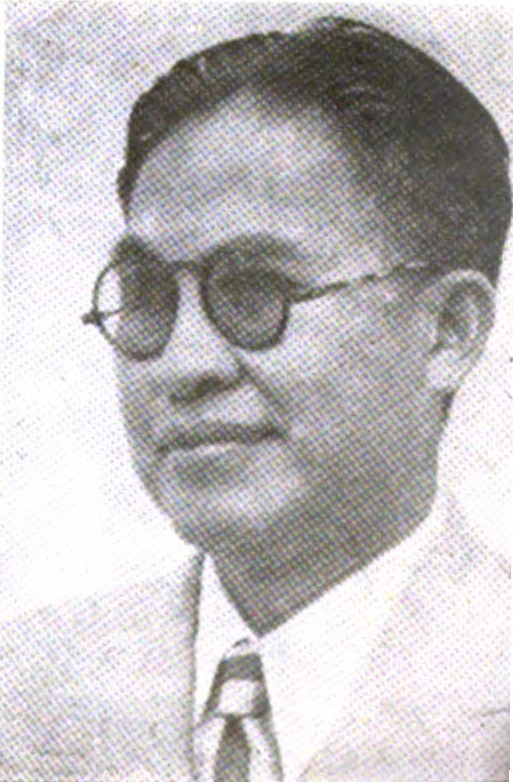

Deputy Speaker of the People's Representative Council
- In office 16 August 1950 – 26 March 1956
- Speaker: Sartono

United States of Indonesia Senator from Southeast Borneo
- In office 16 February 1950 – 16 August 1950
- Preceded by: position created
- Succeeded by: position abolished

Chair of Provisional Representative Body
- In office 24 December 1946 – 27 May 1947
- Preceded by: position created
- Succeeded by: Muhammad Kaharuddin III

Personal details
- Born: 16 April 1906 Pegatan, Kalimantan, Dutch East Indies
- Party: Indonesian National Party; Persatuan Indonesia Raya
- Education: Leiden University

Tadjuddin Noor (16 April 1906 – ?) was an Indonesian politician and nationalist. He was a deputy speaker of the Provisional People's Representative Council between 1950 and 1956, and chaired the legislature of the State of East Indonesia (NIT).

Having worked with Japanese occupiers prior and during the Japanese occupation of the Dutch East Indies, Noor became a proponent for the republican cause within the Dutch-controlled East Indonesia, especially in NIT where he narrowly lost its first election for head of state. He became a senator after the 1949 transfer of sovereignty, and continued to be active in politics during the 1950s as a member of the Constitutional Assembly.

== Early life and education ==
Noor was born in Pegatan, in what is today South Kalimantan, on 16 April 1906. He studied law in Leiden University.

== Career ==
=== Pre-independence ===
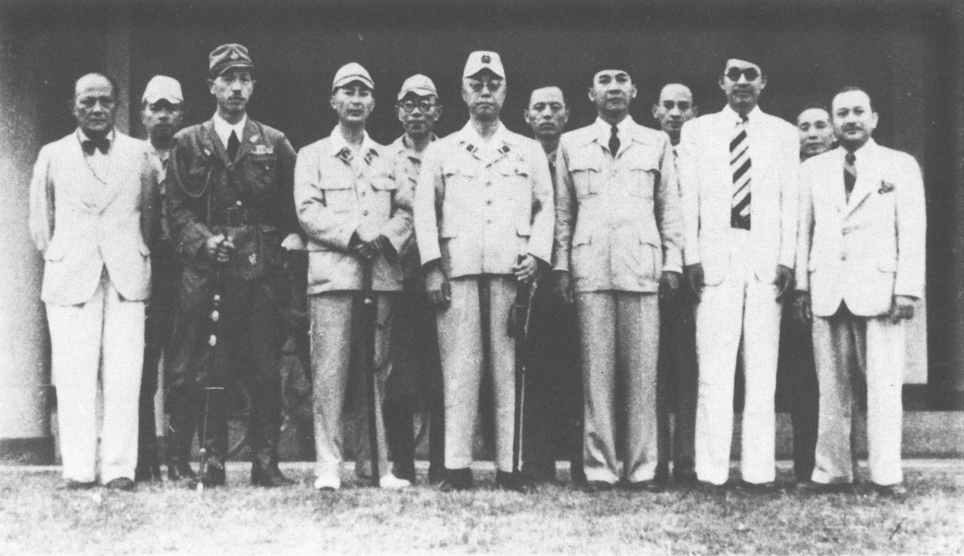
Noor (front row, second from right) in Makassar on 30 April 1945.

After graduating from Leiden, Noor began working as a lawyer in Banjarmasin. He worked there between 1936 and 1939. Starting in July 1939 until the Japanese invasion of the Indies, he became a member of the Volksraad. He began his term as a member of the Nationalist faction led by Mohammad Husni Thamrin called the Fractie National, but only a few months later in the summer of 1939 he left it and joined a breakaway Sumatran group called the Indonesisch nationalistische groep, which was chaired by Mangaradja Soeangkoepon. The other members of this new faction were Abdul Rasjid and Mohammad Yamin. In 1941, he reportedly joined a Japanese fifth column conspiracy to sabotage the Indies' defense for the upcoming invasion, alongside other nationalists such as Achmad Soebardjo and Alexander Andries Maramis and Japanese agents such as Shigetada Nishijima, though, due to the Japanese campaign's rapid success, the sabotage ended up not being required.

In the immediate aftermath of the Japanese invasion, Indonesian nationalists saw the campaign as one of liberation, and formed several draft cabinets in expectation of handover of administrative duties to the nationalist leaders. In one of these cabinets, Noor was proposed as a deputy-minister of state. The proposals were quickly rejected by the Japanese, who soon prohibited displays of Indonesian nationalism to the disappointment of prior collaborators. Noor was initially an adviser to the Imperial Japanese Army in the-renamed Jakarta, before later being appointed by the Imperial Japanese Navy, alongside Manadonese Sam Ratulangi, as advisers in managing Sulawesi, which the navy was tasked with occupying.

=== Revolution and RIS ===
After the surrender of Japan, Noor returned to being a lawyer for some time in Makassar. After the arrest of Ratulangi by the returning Dutch forces, Noor (who had been appointed by nationalists in Java as Ratulangi's deputy republican governor of Sulawesi) became the de facto political leader of the Indonesian independence movement in Sulawesi. He was also head of the Indonesian National Party in Makassar.

During the Denpasar Conference of 1946, which Noor attended, he was considered a key figure in championing the nationalist/republican cause. Later that month, Noor ran as one of two candidates for the head of state of the newly formed State of East Indonesia, but narrowly lost to Tjokorda Gde Raka Soekawati (33–36) following three rounds of voting. After his loss, Noor ran as chairman of the new state's legislature, this time defeating Ambonese KNIL captain Julius Tahija 40–25.

Several months after his appointment as chair, however, he faced opposition due to his perceived bias towards the body's "Progressive faction" (a moniker for legislators who supported Noor's bid as head of state), and his inaction in restraining spectators of the body's meetings from cheering and applauding. For these reasons, he was unanimously voted out from his position on 27 May 1947, and he was replaced as chair by Sultan Muhammad Kaharuddin III. Despite the vote of no confidence, the Progressive faction in NIT proposed that Noor be made minister under Nadjamuddin Daeng Malewa's to-be restructured cabinet, first proposing him as Minister of Social Affairs and later as Minister of Justice, though both proposals were rejected by Malewa due to the vote of no confidence.

Noor was an adviser to the Indonesian delegation during negotiations on board the Renville, and he was arrested by Dutch authorities following Operation Kraai, though by the time of the Roem–Van Roijen Agreement's signing, he was already organizing a welcome ceremony for the return of the republican government to Yogyakarta.

=== Post-1950 ===
By 1950, following the Dutch–Indonesian Round Table Conference and the formation of the United States of Indonesia, Noor became a senator, representing the Southeast Borneo Federation. By 19 August 1950, the federal United States of Indonesia had been converted to the unitary Republic of Indonesia, and Noor was appointed as one of the three deputy speakers of the Provisional People's Representative Council.

During his time in the parliament, Noor was part of the Great Indonesia Unity Party (PIR), chairing its faction in the parliament. He had called for the resignation of the Sukiman Cabinet in December 1951, and during the First Ali Sastroamidjojo Cabinet, a dispute on whether PIR should continue to support the Ali government after losing ministerial posts resulted in the party's split, with one faction under Wongsonegoro and another under Noor and Hazairin. The Wongsonegoro faction was the dominant faction for the party's Javanese members, while the Hazairin-Noor faction derived its support from party offices outside Java. Noor held his parliamentary seat until March 1956. In the 1955 elections, the two PIR factions contested separately, and the Hazairin-Noor faction only secured a single seat.

In April 1959, Noor replaced Hazairin in the Constitutional Assembly of Indonesia, and held a seat there until the body's dismissal by Sukarno on 5 July 1959. He wrote a book, titled The roads to world peace, world prosperity, and social justice, published in 1974.

== Bibliography ==
- Agung, Ide Anak Agung Gde (1996). From the Formation of the State of East Indonesia Towards the Establishment of the United States of Indonesia. Yayasan Obor Indonesia. ISBN 9789794612163.
- Burgers, Herman (2010). De garoeda en de ooievaar; Indonesië van kolonie tot nationale staat (in Dutch). Brill. ISBN 9789067183475.
- Feith, Herbert (2006). The Decline of Constitutional Democracy in Indonesia. Equinox Publishing. ISBN 9789793780450.
- Tim Penyusun Sejarah (1970). Seperempat Abad Dewan Perwakilan Rakjat Republik Indonesia [A Quarter Century of the People's Representative Council of the Republic of Indonesia] (PDF) (in Indonesian). Jakarta: Sekretariat DPR-GR. Archived from the original (PDF) on 7 April 2023.
- Touwen-Bouwsma, Elly (1996). "The Indonesian Nationalists and the Japanese "Liberation" of Indonesia: Visions and Reactions". Journal of Southeast Asian Studies. 27 (1): 1–18. doi:10.1017/S002246340001064X. ISSN 0022-4634. JSTOR 20071754.
