= Rhemrev =

Rhemrev is a Dutch surname originating in Dutch East Indies as one of the surnames of "unchristian children", a reversed/distorted "Vermehr/Vermeer". Notable people with the surname include:

- J.L.W.R. Rhemrev, member of the Indonesian House of Representatives (1950–1956)
- Freddy Rhemrev, winner of the 1990 Atlantic Championship, a support race for the Grand Prix of Toronto
- Victoria Blair Rhemrev, a contestant in Miss Teen USA 2020 and Miss Illinois Teen USA pageants
- Wim Rhemrev, Dutch actor who played in the 1951 Dutch film Kees, de zoon van de Stroper

== Fictional characters ==
- Gyman Rhemrev in the Dutch TV soap opera Onderweg naar Morgen
