= Toorop =

Toorop is a surname of Dutch origin, originaled as an artificial surname of an adopted illegitimate child born by a local woman from a European man, see "Surnames of illegitimate children". People with that name include:

- Charley Toorop (1891–1955), Dutch painter and lithographer, daughter of Jan
- Jan Toorop (1858–1928), Dutch-Indonesian painter, father of Charley
- Linda Toorop (born 1955), Dutch gymnast
- Sacha Toorop (born 1970), Belgian singer and musician

== See also ==
- Torop
