= Mohammad Enoch =

Indonesian politician

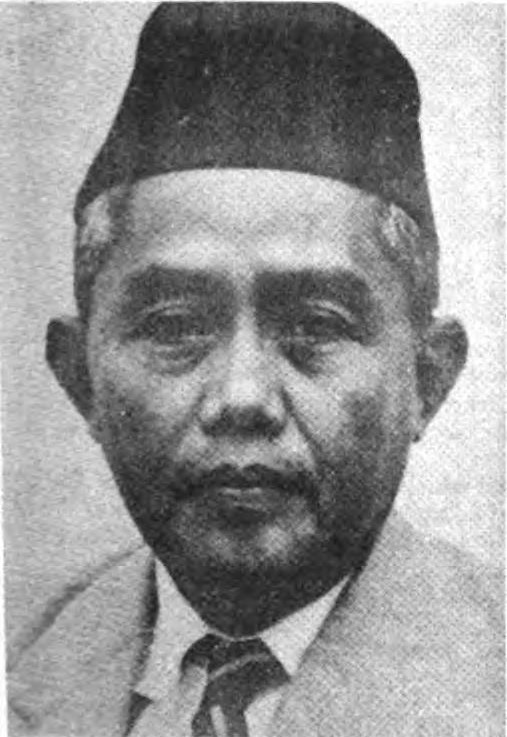

Member of the People's Representative Council
- In office 16 August 1950 – 21 May 1951
- Parliamentary group: Partai Kebangsaan Indonesia

United States of Indonesia Senator from Pasundan
- In office 16 February 1950 – 16 August 1950

3rd Minister of Public Works
- In office 3 July 1947 – 11 August 1947
- Prime Minister: Amir Syarifuddin
- Preceded by: Martinus Putuhena
- Succeeded by: Herling Laoh

Mayor of Yogyakarta
- In office May 1947 – July 1947
- Preceded by: office established
- Succeeded by: Sudarisman Purwokusumo

Personal details
- Born: 17 February 1893 Cianjur, Dutch East Indies
- Died: 16 December 1965 (aged 72)

Mohammad Enoch (17 February 1893 – 16 December 1965) was an Indonesian politician and engineer. He briefly served as Minister of Public Works during the First Amir Sjarifuddin Cabinet prior to his resignation, and also briefly as mayor of Yogyakarta before that.

== Career ==
Enoch was born in Cianjur on 17 February 1893, and obtained his engineering degree in 1930 after 3 years of study. He then joined the Paguyuban Pasundan, becoming a leading member, and also joined the Partai Kebangsaan Indonesia (Parki). After the proclamation of Indonesian independence, Enoch was appointed into the newly formed Supreme Advisory Council as a regular member. On 21 May 1947, the Republican legislature for Yogyakarta elected him as the city's mayor, although his scheduled official swearing in by the president on 23 June 1947 was postponed. By July 1947, he had been appointed as Minister of Public Works, and hence was replaced as mayor by Poerwokoesoemo. He did not serve long in the position, resigning after just one month.

After 1947, Enoch became active in the politics of the State of Pasundan, adopting a pro-Republican (i.e. the Republican government in Yogyakarta) stance as a member of the state's parliament. He had reactivated the then-dormant Paguyuban Pasundan in 1947 while still serving as Yogyakarta's mayor as a reaction to the Pasundan state's formation. In January 1949, while in Bandung, Enoch was arrested by the Dutch military along with a number of other pro-Republican politicians in a successful attempt by the Dutch to intimidate Pasundan politicians. The following day, a large number of Pasundan ministers resigned, forcing Djumhana Wiriaatmadja to moderate his pro-Republican stance in government.

Following the Dutch-Indonesian Round Table Conference and the formation of the United States of Indonesia, he served as a senator representing Pasundan. Enoch, alongside former regent Soejadi, became the temporary speaker of the senate between the swearing in of senate members on 16 February 1950 and the swearing in of a definitive senate speaker on 27 February 1950. During this period, he also served as the chairman of the senate's credential examination committee and the senate's code of conduct committee.

After Indonesia's centralization in 1950, he continued to serve as a legislator in the Provisional People's Representative Council, representing Parki. Enoch resigned from the council on 21 May 1951, and his party never appointed a replacement.

He died on 16 December 1965.
