= Sarino Mangunpranoto =

Indonesian politician and educator (1910–1983)

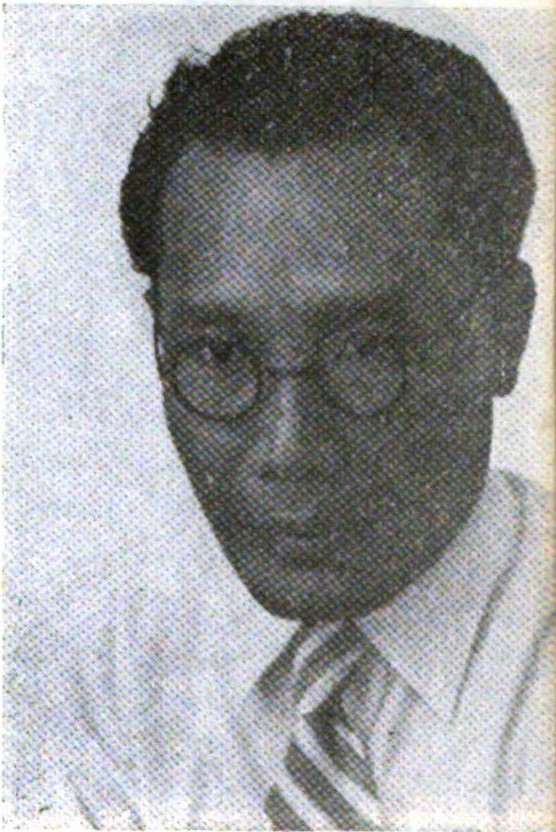
- Portrait of Sarino Mangunpranoto, c. 1954

11th Minister of Education and Culture of Indonesia
- In office 26 March 1956 – 14 March 1957
- Prime Minister: Ali Sastroamidjojo
- Preceded by: Soewandi Notokoesoemo
- Succeeded by: Prijono

Member of the People's Representative Council
- In office 25 June 1960 – 11 August 1962
- Constituency: Central Java
- In office 16 August 1950 – 15 April 1956
- Constituency: Central Java

United States of Indonesia Senator from Central Java
- In office 16 February 1950 – 16 August 1950
- Preceded by: Office established
- Succeeded by: Office disestablished
- Constituency: Central Java

Personal details
- Born: 15 January 1910 Purworejo, Central Java, Dutch East Indies
- Died: 17 January 1983 (aged 73) Jakarta, Indonesia
- Citizenship: Indonesian
- Party: Indonesian National Party
- Other political affiliations: Partindo
- Children: 4
- Education: Taman Siswa
- Occupation: Politician; teacher; educator

Sarino Mangunpranoto (15 January 1910 – 17 January 1983) was an Indonesian politician, teacher, and educator, who served as the 11th Minister of Education and Culture of Indonesia, from 1956 until 1957. A member of the Indonesian National Party (PNI), he also served as the Ambassador of Indonesia to Hungary, a member of the People's Representative Council from 1950 until 1956 and again from 1960 until 1962, as well as a member of the United States of Indonesia Senate, representing Central Java.

== Early life and education ==
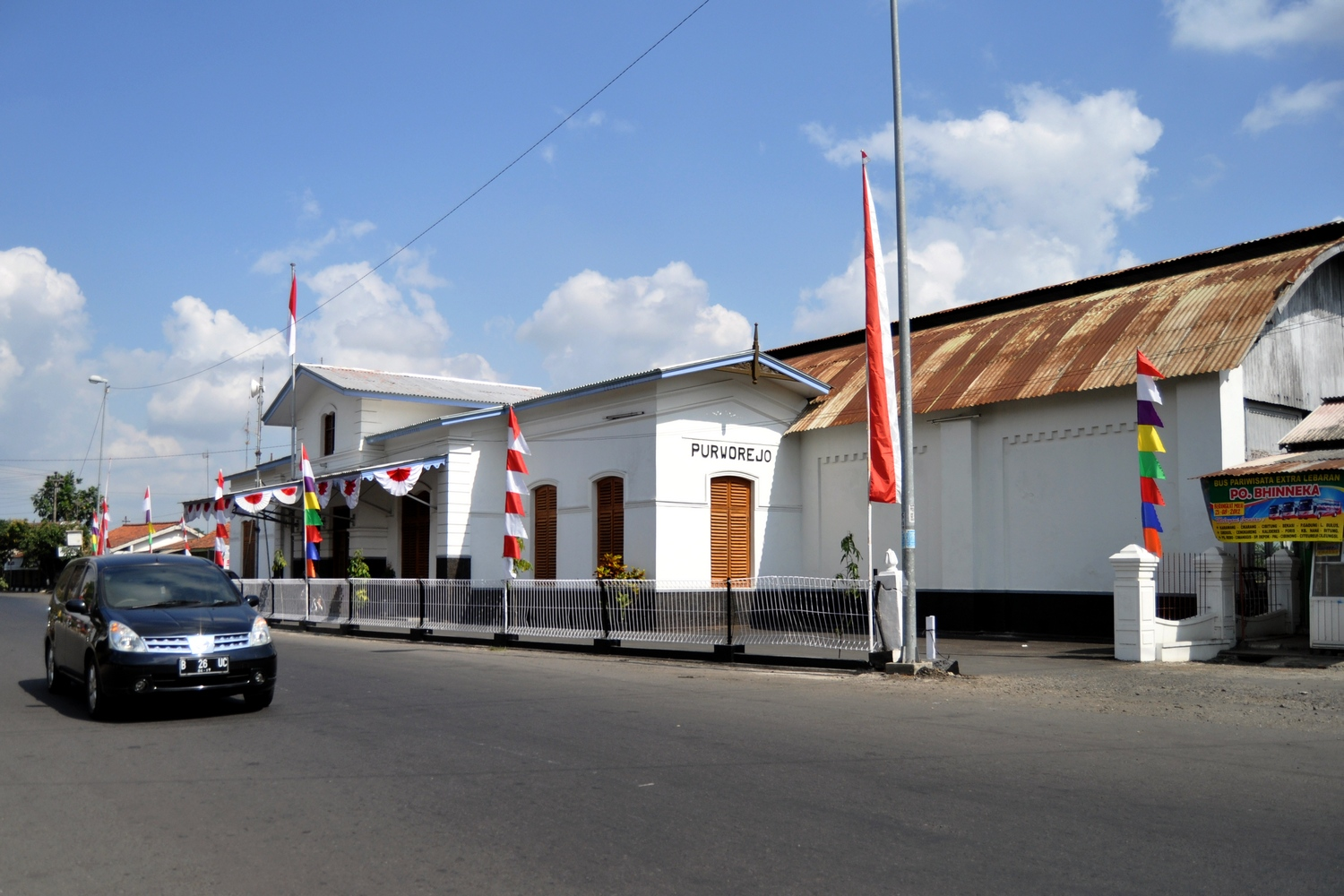
His hometown of Purworejo, Central Java

Sarino Mangunpranoto was born on 15 January 1910, in Begelen, Purworejo, Central Java, Dutch East Indies (now Indonesia). He completed his primary education at the Hollandsch-Inlandsche School (HIS) in Purworejo and in Kebumen, before joining the Taman Siswa in Yogyakarta, where he would become a teacher in the Pemalang branch of the school for thirteen years, from 1929 until the Japanese occupation in 1942, mostly as head teacher.

== Struggle for independence ==
Sarino Mangunpranoto became involved in the Struggle for independence, when he joined Partindo, and ran political courses for the movement in Slawi, where Taman Siswa's regional headquarters were located. Sarino's nationalist sympathies made the Taman Siswa school in Pemalang a safe meeting place for various nationalist groups and organizations. Many of his former students would become prominent leaders during the Indonesian National Revolution.

Following the Japanese invasion of the Dutch East Indies, the new Japanese administration closed the Taman Siswa school system in March 1943, and Sarino then moved to Pati, which is located east of Semarang, where he spent his life founding and managing a sea-fishery cooperative during the occupation. During the early Indonesian National Revolution, Sarino played an important role in the establishment of a Republican government in the region.

After the First Clash between Dutch and Republican forces, he joined the evacuation of Republican administrations from Java's north coast and, when he arrived at Wonosobo, helped set up a residency government "in exile" there. Sarino was also and active as a member of the Indonesian National Party, founding a branch in Pati and being elected to its central leadership in 1948. Following the end of hostilities after the Dutch–Indonesian Round Table Conference, he became a member of the Senate of the United States of Indonesia (USI), representing Central Java, under speaker Melkias Agustinus Pellaupessy.

== Later career and death ==
Following the dissolution of the USI, Sarino became a member of the Provisional People's Representative Council. He was appointed as Minister of Education and Culture of Indonesia in the Second Ali Sastroamidjojo Cabinet, and held his position from 24 March 1956 until the cabinet's dissolution on 14 March 1957. He was also member of the Constitutional Assembly of Indonesia from 9 November 1956 until 5 July 1959. Later, he rejoined the People's Representative Council, but was discharged in 1962, to serve as the Indonesian Ambassador to Hungary. Sarino Mangunpranoto died on 17 January 1983, when he was delivering a speech in Jakarta. He was buried at the Wijaya Brata Cemetery, a cemetery reserved for people associated with the Taman Siswa organization.

== Legacy ==
=== Opinions ===
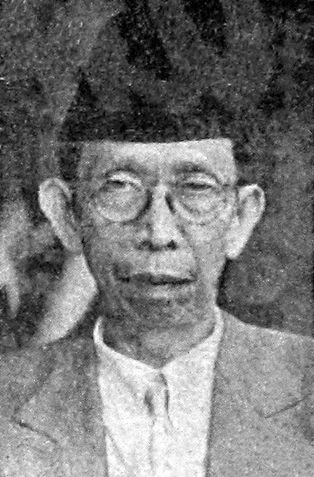
Taman Siswa founder, Ki Hadjar Dewantara

In a conversation with Anton Lucas, who would write a book about Sarino, Sarino talked about the philosophical ideas of the Taman Siswa movement, as well as its founder (who was also Sarino's mentor), Ki Hajar Dewantara. He often quoted the phrase "tut wuri handayani" ("to lead from behind"). Some of those who knew Sarino felt that he epitomized the high Javanese ideal of "sepi ing pamrih, rame ing gawe" ("working industriously without personal ambition").

=== Writings ===
Although politics and foreign affairs occupied much of his career, he considered his foremost work to be in education, with a close friend saying "he was a natural educator." He released his first articles in 1932, at the Pandji Pustaka and Bintang Timoer magazines, on the subject of education. He also wrote on the educative value of children's games for the Taman Siswa journal Madjalah Pusara. Among his numerous articles, Sarino considered Sosio-Nasional Demokrasi (Which was published in Taman Siswa, 1946), Pokok Pikiran Politik Pendidikan Indonesia (Which was published in the Department of Education dan Culture, 1975), and Setahun Cabinet Ampera (Which was published in the Department of Education dan Culture, 1967).
