= Hausman Baboe =

Indonesian official, journalist, and nationalist (c. 1880–1943)

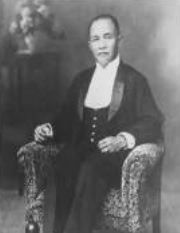
- Born: Early 1880s Kuala Kapuas, Dutch East Indies
- Died: 20 December 1943; Banjarmasin, Japanese-occupied Indonesia

Hausman Baboe was a colonial head of Kuala Kapuas district of Central Kalimantan in the Dutch East Indies; he was also an early Dayak journalist and an Indonesian nationalist. Baboe was born into an aristocratic family of Dayak Ngaju people and served as head of Kuala Kapuas under the Dutch colonial government but was dismissed from his post due to his anti-colonial remarks. He became a prominent Dayak political figure and was several times accused of being a communist due to his close association with the left-wing political party Sarekat Rakjat. (Note: A left-wing split from the Sarekat Islam party which became a political movement for the Communist Party of the Indies (PKI), later the Communist Party of Indonesia (PKI).) Despite being a Christian, his Indonesian nationalist ideals drew him close to Sarekat Islam.

Baboe started several congresses of native Kalimantan organizations and attempted to invite Oemar Said Tjokroaminoto to his congress, which caused unrest across Kalimantan and a subsequent travel ban by the Dutch East Indies government. Baboe was executed in 1943 after the occupying Japanese military accused him of collaborating with former Dutch residents.

== Early life and education ==
Hausman Baboe was born in Hampatong village in the Kuala Kapuas, a town that is now the capital of Kapuas Regency. There are conflicting sources for his birth year; possible dates include 1880, 1881, and 1885. He was born to an Utus Gantung family, an aristocratic class of the Ngaju people. Hampatong village was founded as a result of the outbreak of the Banjarmasin War in 1859, causing a mass exodus from villages near the Mangkatip River, a tributary of the Barito River. Hampatong was inhabited mostly by aristocrat families of the Dayak Ngaju people and Christian missionaries nicknamed it kampong adligendrof (village of nobles). As a result of being born an aristocrat, Baboe and his family enjoyed a relatively privileged life compared to the general population of the region.

Baboe's father Yoesoea Baboe was married to Soemboel, the daughter of a village chief. The couple had nine children, including Baboe. Most of Hausman's siblings left the village after their marriages. Hausman Baboe worked as a colonial administrator and frequently travelled around Kalimantan. He married a woman named Reginae and had eight children. Some sources, however, say he later married a second woman of Banjar ethnicity, whom he later divorced. According to these sources, this second marriage brought him a child named Roeslan Baboe, for whom Baboe and Reginae cared.

Baboe was educated by Christian missionaries. It is unclear if he ever pursued higher education due to a lack of records. He was appointed as head of the Kuala Kapuas district despite it being unclear if he fulfilled the requirements to do so, such as receiving a higher education. Heads of districts usually needed to be graduates of OSVIA (Opleiding School Voor Inlandsche Ambtenaren), the indigenous civil-servant school. Indonesian historians speculated Baboe was appointed due to his aristocratic status and because his grandfather Nikodemus Ambo was also a district chief. In 1905, Baboe started to work as a journalist for the newspaper Sinar Borneo; he also worked as a district chief between 1919 and 1922.

== Political career ==
Hausman Baboe was inspired by early contemporaneous political movements and organizations in Surabaya, and argued for the establishment of Pakat Dayak, a Dayak-based political organization similar to those of Sarekat Islam and Indische Party. In February 1922, Baboe was dismissed from his job as district chief due to his increasingly anti-colonial remarks, and Pakat Dayak's support for a Sarekat Islam insurrection in Sampit and Pangkalan Bun.

In 1920, Baboe established a cooperative under Pakat Dayak. He was described by missionary records as "susceptible to communist ideas" and, due to his political activities, was placed under tight government surveillance. In 1924, Baboe founded a school for Dayak called Hollandsche Dajak School, which was used to spread nationalist ideas among Dayak youths. He continued to help Sarekat Islam, spreading its political activities across Kalimantan; he also founded another private school in Mentangai. In Java, Baboe became friends with Oemar Said Tjokroaminoto, the chairman of Sarekat Islam. Briefly after Tjokroaminoto's release and his rumoured plan to visit Kalimantan, Baboe mobilized Dayak political organizations such as Serikat Dajak, another Dayak organization, to distribute pamphlets about the visit to the interior Dayak populations. The goal was to rally political support behind Tjokroaminoto and spread anti-government ideas. As a result of unrest following Tjokroaminoto's actions, the government banned Tjokroaminoto from visiting Kalimantan and placed a travel ban across Kalimantan to limit the spread of Baboe's pamphlets. The travel ban proved to be ineffective.

In 1923, Baboe together with many Dayak activists established the National Borneo Council and in April that year held the National Borneo Congress in Banjarmasin. Baboe was referred to in the congress as "advisor for government affairs" for Sarekat Islam; he wrote a grievance motion to the Governor General of Dutch East Indies but this did not have the effect he had hoped for. From 1924 to 1930, Dutch colonial administrators, who were known as colonial residents, in Kalimantan routinely included mentions of Baboe in their reports, minimizing his influence and trying to assure the colonial government in Batavia he was not a significant threat. In October 1925, Baboe gave speech to around 200 Christian Dayaks in Kuala Kapuas regarding land rights, women's status, and urging native Kalimantan people to join labour unions. He also argued villagers should grow vegetables and fruits rather than rubber, arguing for the abolition of the slaughter tax, and arguing in favour of cooperation between the Communist Party of Indonesia (PKI) and Sarekat Islam in Java. Newspapers in Banjarmasin later reported his meeting as a communist activity.

In 1925, both Sarekat Islam and Sarekat Dajak made another attempt to invite Tjokroaminoto to Kalimantan; they also invited Agus Salim. Later, as the chairman of Sarekat Dajak, Baboe co-wrote the invitation with Mohamad Arip and Mohamad Horman of Sarekat Islam. As a result, the colonial government again banned the invited figures from Java from entering Kalimantan but the congress under Sarekat Dajak was still held, mainly focusing on the land tax and forced labour. In December 1926, Baboe and Sarekat Dajak led another National Borneo Congress. He also started to argue for Dayak representation in the Volksraad, and that the absence of secondary schools in Dayak districts showed the Dutch administration was discriminating against Dayaks.

Two months before the 1926 National Borneo Congress, Baboe established Suara Borneo, a newspaper with strong Indonesian nationalist sentiments. His newspaper was short-lived, mainly due to lack of funding and because the colonial government in Banjarmasin expelled its editor Achmad for communist tendencies. Achmad, a teacher and activist from East Java, was affiliated with Sarekat Rakjat and PKI. He was exiled to Kalimantan in 1925 and was befriended by Baboe the next year. Fearing a nationwide communist revolt and to separate him from Baboe, police sent Achmad back to Java in November 1926 under pretext of facing trial. Suara Borneo later wrote Achmad's detention proved he was doing the right thing.

Suara Borneo mostly attracted readers from the urban Dayaks and Malays in Banjarmasin, and reached some readers as far away as Makassar. The newspaper was marked by ideas of the Indonesian National Awakening, that all ethnic identities should see all of themselves as part of a whole and that all Indonesian people "were united in the same fate". Baboe named the first edition of his newspaper "Progress", and urged readers to subscribe and submit news to the newspaper as long as it was not slanderous or about religion. His writing moved away from land rights and taxes, mostly relevant only to Dayaks, towards identity issues, challenging the "savage stereotypes" often used against Indonesian ethnicities such as the Dayaks and Madurese. Baboe was criticized by Bingkisan, another progressive newspaper based in Banjarmasin, which said his criticism of colonial governments was often too polite and soft. Gerry van Klinken, researcher of Dayak political history, said Baboe's moderation was due to his age—by that time he was older than most Indonesian nationalist leaders—and because he was relatively wealthy.

== Later life and death ==
By the 1930s, Baboe's remarks had grown more moderate and the colonial government no longer regarded him as the threat he used to be. He was the first Dayak in Banjarmasin to own a motor vehicle, and he also bought a residential building and a warehouse in Surabaya for his own family. He later became a relatively successful trader and businessman in Kalimantan. Around this time, just before the Japanese invasion of the colony, the colonial government tried to separate the Malay and Banjarese populations from the Dayaks. As a result, there was a resurgence of traditional identity politics and a weakening of previous nationalist sentiments.

During the Japanese occupation, the Japanese military executed Baboe on 20 December 1943, together with 250 other people, due to accusations of collaboration with former Dutch residents. His three eldest sons were also executed.

== Legacy ==
Hausman Baboe is regarded as an early figure who brought native Kalimantan, and especially Dayak, participation in the Indonesian nationalist movement. His organizations such as Sarekat Dajak later became the foundation of Dayak political movements in Kalimantan and Indonesia. He was also a pioneer of journalism in Kalimantan. Together with George Obus and Tjilik Riwut, Baboe is regarded as a pioneer of the nationalist movement in what is today Central Kalimantan, and he was crucial for the spread of Indonesian nationalism within Kalimantan. Baboe's ideas led to the creation of Central Kalimantan province in 1957.

In November 1938, Dayak political movements again tried to be appointed to the Volksraad under the name "Committee for Dayak Tribal Awareness". Its members, who were led by Baboe's nephew Mahir Mahar, were civil servants who had been educated as students and teachers at Baboe's schools. One of his sons Ruslan Baboe later became a prominent Indonesian diplomat, working as a consul for Indonesia in San Francisco, and later as Indonesian ambassador to Hungary between 1970 and 1974.

A street in Palangka Raya is named after Hausman Baboe.
