= Torop =

Torop (Russian: Тороп) is a surname. Notable people with the surname include:

- Peeter Torop (born 1950), Estonian semiotician
- Sergei Torop, lay name of Vissarion (born 1961), Russian cult leader
- Vladislav Torop, Russian footballer

== See also ==
- Toorop
