= Muhammad Kaharuddin III =

Indonesian politician (1902–1975)

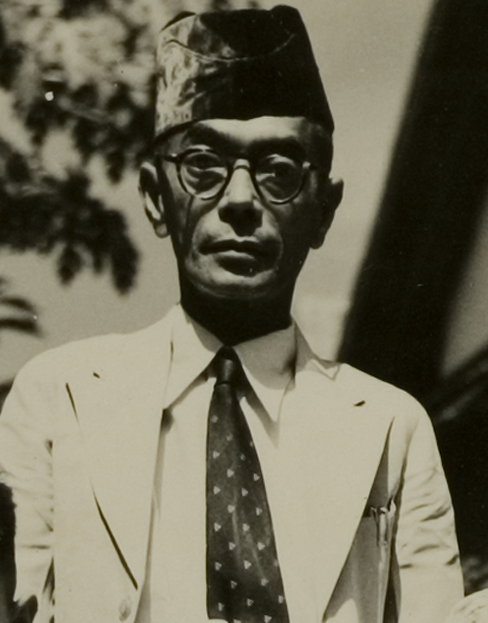
- Muhammad Kaharuddin III in 1947

Regent of Sumbawa
- In office 22 January 1959 – 1960
- Preceded by: Position created
- Succeeded by: Madilaoe ADT

United States of Indonesia Senator
- In office 16 February 1950 – 5 April 1950
- Succeeded by: Pandji Tisna
- Constituency: State of East Indonesia

Sultan of Sumbawa
- In office 1931 – 8 November 1975 (Note: Another alternative date is 17 December 1958, upon the reorganization of the Sultanate's territories into West Nusa Tenggara. His death in 1975 is the date considered as the start of the vacancy of the throne by his successor.)
- Preceded by: Muhammad Jalaluddin III
- Succeeded by: Muhammad Kaharuddin IV

Chair of Provisional Representative Body
- In office 27 May 1947 – 2 March 1950
- Preceded by: Tadjuddin Noor
- Succeeded by: Husain Puang Limboro

Personal details
- Born: Muhammad Kaharuddin Daeng Manurung; 1902 Sumbawa Besar, Dutch East Indies
- Died: 8 November 1975 (aged 73) Sumbawa Besar, West Nusa Tenggara, Indonesia

Muhammad Kaharuddin III (1902 – 8 November 1975) was an Indonesian politician and royal who was the 16th Sultan of Sumbawa, a senator of the United States of Indonesia, and the regent of Sumbawa Regency between 1959 and 1960. He was also active in the politics of the State of East Indonesia, where he chaired its legislature between 1947 and its dissolution in 1950.

== Career ==
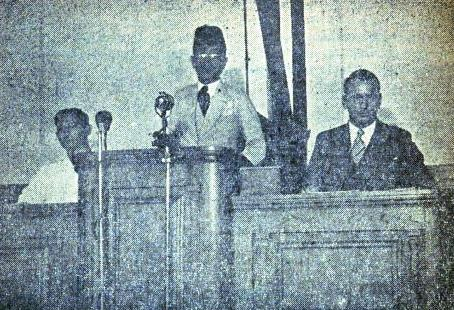
Kaharuddin (center) as Speaker of the East Indonesia parliament.

He was born in Sumbawa Besar on 1902, the son of Sultan Muhammad Jalaluddin III. He ascended to the throne on his father's death in 1931, and married the eldest daughter of Sultan Muhammad Salahuddin of the neighboring Sultanate of Bima. In 1932, a new palace was completed, which he lived in until 1959. Following the Japanese invasion of the Dutch East Indies, both Kaharuddin and the Sultan of Bima announced that their Sultanates were seceding from Dutch authority, and "awaited the arrival of Japanese forces". On 14 December 1948, he signed an agreement with the Dutch colonial authorities which ceded rights to foreign relations, defense, and the monopoly on salt and opium trade to the Dutch.

During the Indonesian National Revolution, Kaharuddin attended the Denpasar Conference, where he unsuccessfully proposed the inclusion of Kalimantan in the State of East Indonesia (NIT). He was also active in NIT, where he was appointed the speaker of the parliament. He was appointed to the position after the removal of the previous chair, Tadjuddin Noor, on 27 May 1947. Due to this position, he was approached by Abdul Haris Nasution, who unsuccessfully attempted to lobby Kaharuddin into allowing the Indonesian National Armed Forces to place their officers in the territorial commands in Eastern Indonesia. He also for a time in 1947 served as acting president due to the departure of East Indonesia President Tjokorda Gde Raka Soekawati to attend a United Nations Security Council meeting. During this acting presidency, he dismissed NIT's prime minister Nadjamuddin Daeng Malewa. He remained as chairman of NIT's parliament until he was replaced by Husain Puang Limboro on 2 March 1950.

Kaharuddin also represented NIT in the Senate of the United States of Indonesia alongside Melkias Agustinus Pellaupessy. He later resigned from the senate on 5 April 1950, and was replaced by Pandji Tisna who took office on 14 August 1950. On 22 January 1959, Sumbawa's status as an autonomous region was revoked, hence abolishing the remaining authority of the sultanate, and Kaharuddin was provisionally appointed as its first regent. He served in that position until 1960.

== Death ==
He died on 8 November 1975 in his home at Sumbawa Besar, at the age of 73. He was buried there, next to his father's grave. The Sultanate's throne remained vacant until 2011, when his son Daeng Mohammad Abdurrahman Kaharuddin ascended to the throne as Sultan Muhammad Kaharuddin IV, although without any governing authority. The Sultan Muhammad Kaharuddin III Airport in Sumbawa is named after him. The house he occupied from his abdication until his death, known as Bala Kuning, contains a number of artifacts of the sultanate and is a tourist destination.
