= Oevaang Oeray =

Indonesian politician (1922–1986)

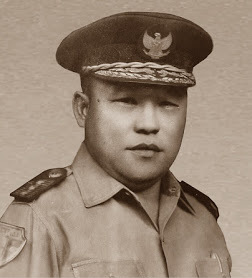
- Official portrait, c. 1960s

1st Governor of West Kalimantan
- In office 30 January 1960 – 1 July 1966
- Preceded by: Office established
- Succeeded by: Soemadi

2nd Chairman of the Dayak Unity Party
- In office 1 January 1947 – 12 May 1947
- Preceded by: Marinus Andjioe
- Succeeded by: Agustinus Jelani

Legislative offices
- 1977–1982: Member of the People's Representative Council from West Kalimantan
- 1956–1959: Member of the Constitutional Assembly from West Kalimantan

Personal details
- Born: 18 August 1922 Mendalam, Kapuas Hulu
- Died: 17 July 1986 (aged 63) Pontianak, Indonesia
- Party: Dayak Unity Party (1947–1961); Golongan Karya (1977–1986)

Johanes Chrisostomus Oevaang Oeray (18 August 1922 – 17 July 1986) was an Indonesian politician. He was the Governor of West Kalimantan from 1960 to 1966; he was the first ethnic Dayak to hold the position.

Oevaang Oeray was a founder of the Dayak Unity Party, which participated in the Indonesian elections of 1955. He was a staunch supporter of freedom of religion and the separation of church and state.

== Biography ==
Oevaang Oeray was born in Kedamin, Kapuas Hulu, on 18 August 1922. He was the youngest child born to Ledjo and Hurei, Dayak (Kayan) farmers and rubber workers.

Oeray served as the regent of Sintang Regency from 1955 to 1959. In 1959 Oevang was selected as the Governor of West Kalimantan by the provincial legislative board. This was confirmed by President Sukarno with Presidential Decree 465/1959, dated 24 December 1959. Oevang's term was to last from 1 January 1960 until 12 July 1966. The success of his Dayak Unity Party, which received 146,054 votes during the 1955 legislative election, led to non-Dayaks accusing him of nepotism, selecting only ethnic Dayaks for government employment and thus dividing the province on ethnic lines.

In 1964 General Supardjo, the commander of the IV Mandala Siaga Fighting Squad, took complete military control of the province. He left the area in 1965 after receiving a letter from his wife and was replaced by A. J. Witono, who fought against guerrillas along the Sarawak border. Oevaang Oeray lent Winoto political support.

As Oevaang Oeray was close to President Sukarno/Soekarnois, after the 30 September Movement killed six generals in Jakarta Oevaang Oeray was accused of being involved with the Indonesian Communist Party. Although Oevaang Oeray was a leftist, he was not a supporter of the Communist Party. Many other ethnic Dayaks were accused of being communist sympathisers during this time.

On 12 July 1966 Internal Minister Basuki Rahmat dismissed Oevaang Oeray, replacing him with Lieutenant Colonel Soemadi. This was a little more than two months before his term was to expire, and based on Decree Number UP.12/2/43-912 of 12 July 1966. Soemadi was reconfirmed in 1967.

== Legacy ==
The government of West Kalimantan has put forth Oeray and Djeranding Abdurrahman as possible National Heroes, but as of July 2012 this title has not been granted. This proposal has received support from the People's Consultative Assembly leader Hajriyanto Y Thohari.

Political offices
Preceded by Djenal Asikin Judadibrata	Governor of West Kalimantan; 1960–1966	Succeeded by Soemardi
