= Valentinus Sudjito =

Indonesian politician

Dr. Raden Valentinus Sudjito
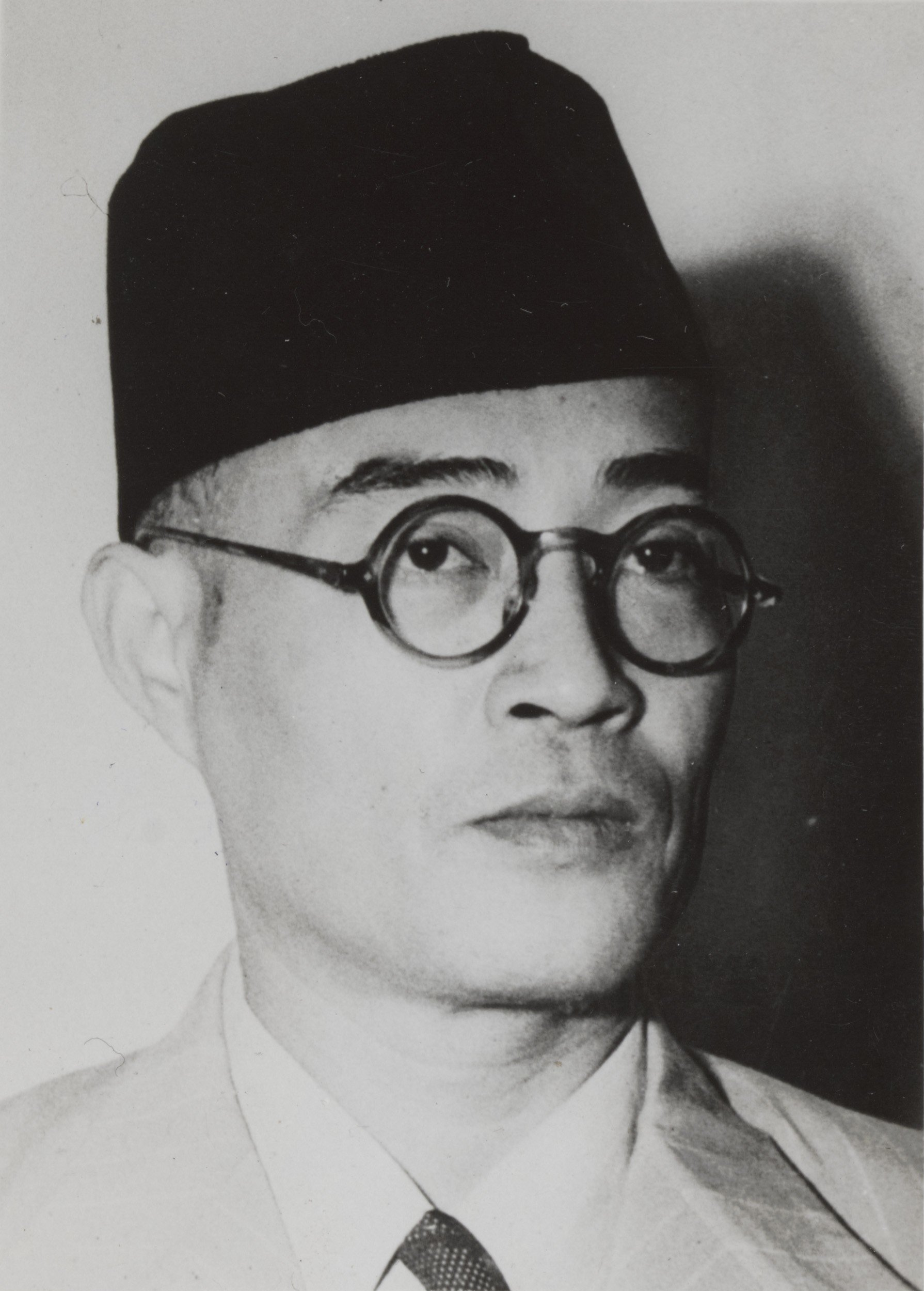

Speaker of the Provisional People's Representative Council of Central Java
- In office 25 February 1949 – 16 February 1950

United States of Indonesia Senator from Central Java
- In office 16 February 1950 – 16 August 1950

Member of the People's Representative Council
- In office 16 August 1950 – 26 March 1956

Member of the Constitutional Assembly
- In office 9 November 1956 – 10 June 1958

Personal details
- Born: 13 October 1905 Mendut, Magelang, Dutch East Indies
- Died: 10 June 1958 (aged 52) Semarang, Central Java, Indonesia
- Party: Catholic Party
- Spouse: Tarcisia Soehaksi Dirdjodipoero

Dr. Raden Valentinus Sudjito Dwijoatmojo (13 October 1905 – 10 June 1958) was a politician from the Catholic Party. He chaired the legislature of Central Java—serving as the leader of the region—from 1949 until 1950. He was also the member of the Senate, the Provisional People's Representative Council, and the Constitutional Assembly.

== Early life ==
Sudjito was born in Mendut, Magelang, on 13 October 1905. He went to study at the HIS, and later to a seminary organized by the Jesuits in Muntilan. After graduating, he went to the STOVIA in Jakarta, and obtained his medical diploma in 1930.

== Career ==
=== Doctor ===
After graduating from STOVIA, he began to work at various hospitals. From 1930 to 1931, he worked at the Central Hospital at Semarang and at the Bandung Eye Hospital. In 1931 he moved to South Sumatra, and became a doctor in the Pagar Alam Hospital. He was called back to Java in 1933 when he was appointed as the head of the Muntilan Hospital. He would hold the position for eleven years, until he was appointed as the head of the Purworedjo Hospital in 1944. He resigned from the position in 1947, when he opened his own clinic in Tegal. He closed his clinic in 1949 and became more involved in politics.

=== Politics ===
After the independence of Indonesia, Sudjito was elected as the deputy speaker of the Indonesia National Committee of Purworedjo, and later as its speaker. He was appointed later to the Central Indonesian National Committee, representing the Catholic Party.

After the Operation Kraai, the Dutch Army occupied Central Java. The Dutch appointed a Recomba (government commissioner for administrative affairs) for Central Java. The Recomba formed the parliament of Central Java (Provisional People's Representative Council of Central Java) on 23 February 1949. An election for the speaker was held on the same day, with Sudjito running as one of two candidates for the speaker (de facto leader of Central Java). He was elected as the speaker after winning against Slamet Tirtosubroto (52–32). He was officially installed as the speaker on 25 February 1949.

As the leader of Central Java, Sudjito stated that he had no intention to upgrade the status of Central Java to a full state.

== Bibliography ==
- Bastiaans, W. Ch. J. (1950), Personalia Van Staatkundige Eenheden (Regering en Volksvertegenwoordiging) in Indonesie (per 1 Sept. 1949) (PDF), Jakarta
- Ministry of Information (1954), Kami Perkenalkan [We Introduce] (PDF) (in Indonesian), Jakarta: Archipel Printers & Editors
- Syahrul Hidayat and Kevin W. Fogg (2017), Dr. R. Valentinus Soedjito Dwidjoatmodjo
- "Midden-Java-raad heeft dagelijks bestuur". Het dagblad. Jakarta. 26 February 1949.
