= Imam Soetardjo =

Indonesian politician and businessman (1916–1966)

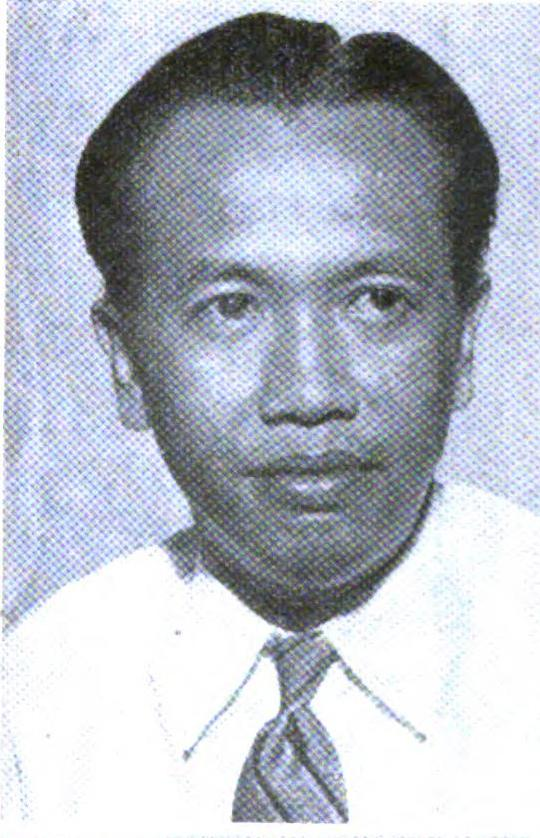
- Official portrait, c. 1954

Member of the House of Representatives
- In office 20 February 1954 – 24 June 1960
- Constituency: East Java (1956–1959)

Personal details
- Born: 21 January 1916 Tegalombo, Pacitan, Dutch East Indies (now Indonesia)
- Died: 6 November 1966 (aged 50) Jakarta, Indonesia
- Party: Labour Party

Imam Soetardjo (EYD: Imam Sutarjo; 21 January 1916 – 6 November 1966) was an Indonesian politician and businessman. A member of the Labour Party, he served in the House of Representatives from 1954 to 1960. After leaving politics, he worked as the business director of a state-owned firm until his death.

== Early life and career ==
Imam Soetardjo was born on 21 January 1916 in Tegalombo, Pacitan Regency, in what was then the Dutch East Indies (present-day Indonesia). He received his education at Taman Dewasa Raya, a high school run by the Taman Siswa movement. He began working as a journalist in either 1936 or 1937 and became an editor for the Keng Po daily newspaper in Batavia from 1937 to 1942. Around the same time, Soetardjo joined the Indonesia Muda and Pemuda Taman Siswa youth groups and was arrested for 8 months by the Dutch authorities.

During the Japanese occupation period (1942–1945), he was an editor at Asia Raya in Jakarta, as well as a member of the Suishintai, rising to the position of daitaicho or commander. Following the proclamation of Indonesian independence in 1945, he found himself in Surakarta with a leadership position within the Barisan Banteng militia and becoming the editor-in-chief of the Pacific daily. In 1949, he was arrested by the Dutch and put in a prison camp as a political prisoner for 11 months. Upon his release in 1950, he worked as a civil servant in the Ministry of Labour.

== Political career ==
Soetardjo was a member of the People's Democratic Party which, in 1952, was merged into the Labour Party. He became part of the party's central leadership. In 1953, he went abroad to the United States, United Kingdom, and the Netherlands as part of an assignment to study labour issues. A year later, he became an advisor to the Indonesian delegation headed to the United Nations. On 20 February 1954, Soetardjo was appointed a member of the Provisional House of Representatives representing the Labour Party. He retained his seat in the 1955 elections from the constituency of East Java, becoming one of only two parliamentarians that the Labour Party elected. Within the new parliament, he sat as part of the Proclamation Supporting Faction. Soetardjo was sworn in as an legislator on 24 March 1956 and served in office until 24 June 1960.

== Later life and death ==
In the 1950s, car assembly plants in Indonesia — such as the Indonesian Service Company of Hasyim Ning — were assembling American-made cars for companies like General Motors. President Sukarno sought to create a 'national car' which would be a symbol of national pride. This led to the creation of PT Industri Mobil Indonesia Usaha Negara dan Swasta (PT Imindo Uneswa) as a joint venture between the Indonesian government and the private sector. In 1965, President Sukarno released Presidential Decree Number 54 of 1965 which established the company as a 'vital body' and appointed its leadership. Soetardjo was appointed to the company's board of directors as its business director. He died on 6 November 1966.
