= National Dayak Customary Council =

National Dayak Customary Council (Majelis Adat Dayak Nasional) is an official customary council of the Dayak people in Indonesia that acts as the highest authority over other cultural or traditional councils of the Dayak people. It has branches from the provincial level to the village level in the entire Kalimantan and is funded by the Indonesian government. It was established on 5 September 2006 after the 2nd National Indonesian Dayak Conference in Pontianak regarding matters of funding the organization and its structure, and has been incorporated into laws by various local governments in Kalimantan. The president of the council is elected by representatives of regional branches for a five year term. The current president of the council from 2021 to 2026 is Marthin Billa, who was previously regent of Malinau Regency and chief of the North Kalimantan provincial Dayak Council.

The organization has been controversial in Indonesia due to enforcement of Dayak tribal laws and its hostility against a perceived threat of Islamism including opposition of the Islamic Defenders Front. The organization has authority to fine corporations operating in Kalimantan if they violate tribal laws. However, the organization took a controversial position in late 2020 regarding the case of Efendi Buhing, a Dayak figure who was accused of stealing a chainsaw and reported by palmoil company to the police, who treated it as "pure criminal case" and not a concern of tribal laws. The organization was criticized by the Indonesian public for siding with the company instead of protecting Buhing.

The organization has a paramilitary wing, Batamad, which is expected to enforce tribal laws and combat religious extremism.
