= Agustinus Jelani =

Indonesian politician

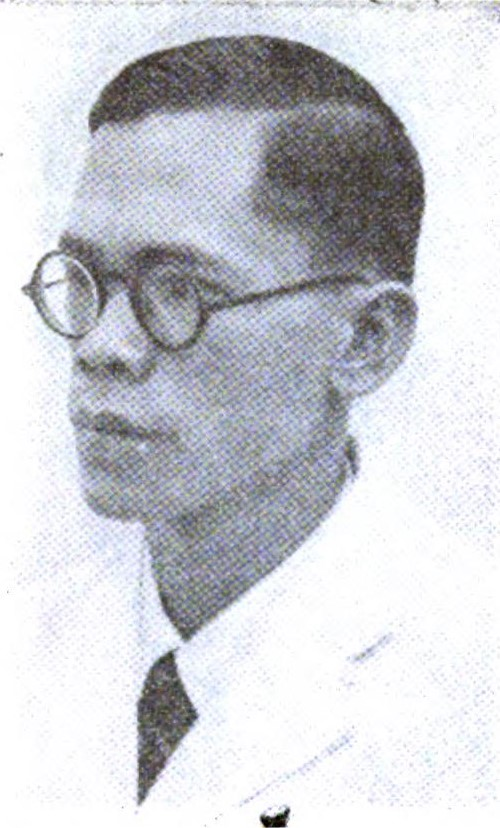
- Jelani in 1950

5th Regent of Pontianak Regency
- In office 16 April 1959 – 1966
- Preceded by: Raden Koesno
- Succeeded by: Gusti Usman Idris

Member of the Senate of the United States of Indonesia
- In office 16 February 1950 – 16 August 1950

Member of the Constitutional Assembly of Indonesia
- In office 9 November 1956 – 5 July 1959

Chairman of the Dayak Unity Party
- In office 12 May 1947 – 13 October 1958
- Preceded by: Oevaang Oeray
- Succeeded by: Franciscus Conradus Palaoensoeka

Personal details
- Born: August 28, 1919 Putussibau, West Kalimantan, Dutch East Indies
- Died: 1977 (aged 58) Jakarta, Indonesia
- Party: PPD (1947–1960); Partindo (1960–1966); IPKI (1966–1971); Golkar (1971–1977)

Agustinus Jelani (Old spelling: Agustinus Djaelani, Agustinus Djelani) (28 August 1919 – 1977) was an Indonesian Dayak politician, and the chairman of the Dayak Unity Party from 1947 until 1958. He was also a member of the Senate of the United States of Indonesia, representing West Kalimantan, member of the People's Representative Council from 1950 until 1956, and the member of the Constitutional Assembly of Indonesia from 1956 until 1959.

== Early life ==
Agustinus Jelani was born on August 28, 1919, in Putussibau, West Kalimantan.

He began his studies at the C. V. O. Seminarium, which he finished in 1937. Later on, he went to the Intermediate Seminary, which he entered in 1941, and finished in 1944. After that, he went to the Grand Seminary of Philosophy in Flores, and finished it in 1946.

== Political career ==
=== In the Dayak Unity Party ===
After he finished his studies, he went back to his hometown, West Kalimantan, and found himself heavily participated in the Dayak Unity Party. After the establishment of the party on 1 October 1946, he was assigned as the adviser to the party. He would later assume the position as the chairman of the party on 12 May 1947, replacing Oevaang Oeray, as he was appointed as the member of the Daily Government Agency of the newly formed Autonomous Region of West Kalimantan.

Concurrently with his appointment as the chairman of the party, the Autonomous Region of West Kalimantan was established. The autonomous region was incorporated into the United States of Indonesia. Jelani was appointed as the member of the Senate of the United States of Indonesia on 16 February 1950. The senate was short lived, as it would later be dissolved on 16 August 1950, and the members of the senate were appointed in the People's Representative Council. Jelani became the member of the council from 16 August 1950 until 30 March 1956.

After the new council based on the 1955 election was formed, Jelani was nominated as the member of the Constitutional Assembly of Indonesia in the 1955 Indonesian Constitutional Assembly election. The Dayak Unity Party won 169,222 votes in the election, or 0.45% of the total votes, allowing the party to have three representatives seated in the assembly. Jaelani was elected, along with Oevaang Oeray and Willibrordus Hittam.

Due to the minimal recognition of the Dayak Unity Party at the national level, Jelani was listed as the member of the Catholic Party during his term as the member of the senate and the council. Only after the 1955 elections, he was listed as the member of the Dayak Unity Party.

In the Indonesian local elections, the local elections for the regional council of the West Kalimantan were conducted on 22 May 1958. The result was a great success for the party, which obtained more than 40% of the votes in the election, allowing it to have 37,2% seats in the local councils of West Kalimantan. In the Pontianak Regency, the regional council was seated by 13 representatives of the party. Due to the majority of the party in the council, the council elected Djelani as the regent of the Pontianak Regency on 13 October 1958. Djelani was officially appointed on 16 April 1959, replacing Raden Koesno.

After the rise of Suharto as the president of Indonesia, most of the governors or regents from non-military background were replaced by those who had military background. In the Pontianak Regency, Djelani was replaced by Colonel Gusti Usman Idris in 1966. Idris had previously served as the speaker of the regional council of the regency. Djelani was appointed as the advisors to Idris.

=== In Partindo and IPKI ===
After the dissolution of the Dayak Unity Party, there were two factions of the party. The nationalist faction, which was led by Oevaang Oeray, fused into the Partindo. The religious faction, which was led by F. C. Palaunsuka, joined the Catholic Party.

Jelani joined the Partindo in 1963. After the failed 30 September Movement, Partindo was considered as a Marxist organization in Indonesia. To avoid the persecution of the former Dayak Unity Party members in Partindo, Jelani and Oevaang Oeray cooperated with local militer forces, and moved those former members of the Dayak Unity Party into the League of Supporters of Indonesian Independence (IPKI).

=== In Golkar ===
Even though IPKI would later fuse into the Indonesian Democratic Party in 1973, authorities in West Kalimantan had threatened to arrest ex-Partindo members in IPKI to join Golkar since the early 1970. The authorities began by transferring Oevaang Oeray, the leader of the ex-Partindo members, to Jakarta. The move was seen as to reduce the influence of Dayak politics. Oeray initially refused to comply with the transfer. Not until 20 March 1971 did he finally decide to leave; it was clear that arrest by the military was imminent if he refused to board the plane to Jakarta.

The departure of Oeray to Jakarta influenced Dayaks who still joined IPKI. On 17 April 1971, Jelani, along with four other Dayak leaders, publicly announced that they were joining Golkar.

== Bibliography ==
- Ministry of Information (1954), Kami Perkenalkan [We Introduce] (PDF) (in Indonesian), Jakarta: Archipel Printers & Editors
- Tanasaldy, Taufiq (2014), Regime Change and Ethnic Politics in Indonesia: Dayak Politics of West Kalimantan (in Indonesian), Jakarta: KITLV Press Leiden, ISBN 9789004253483
