= Kota Pagatan =

- Administrative village
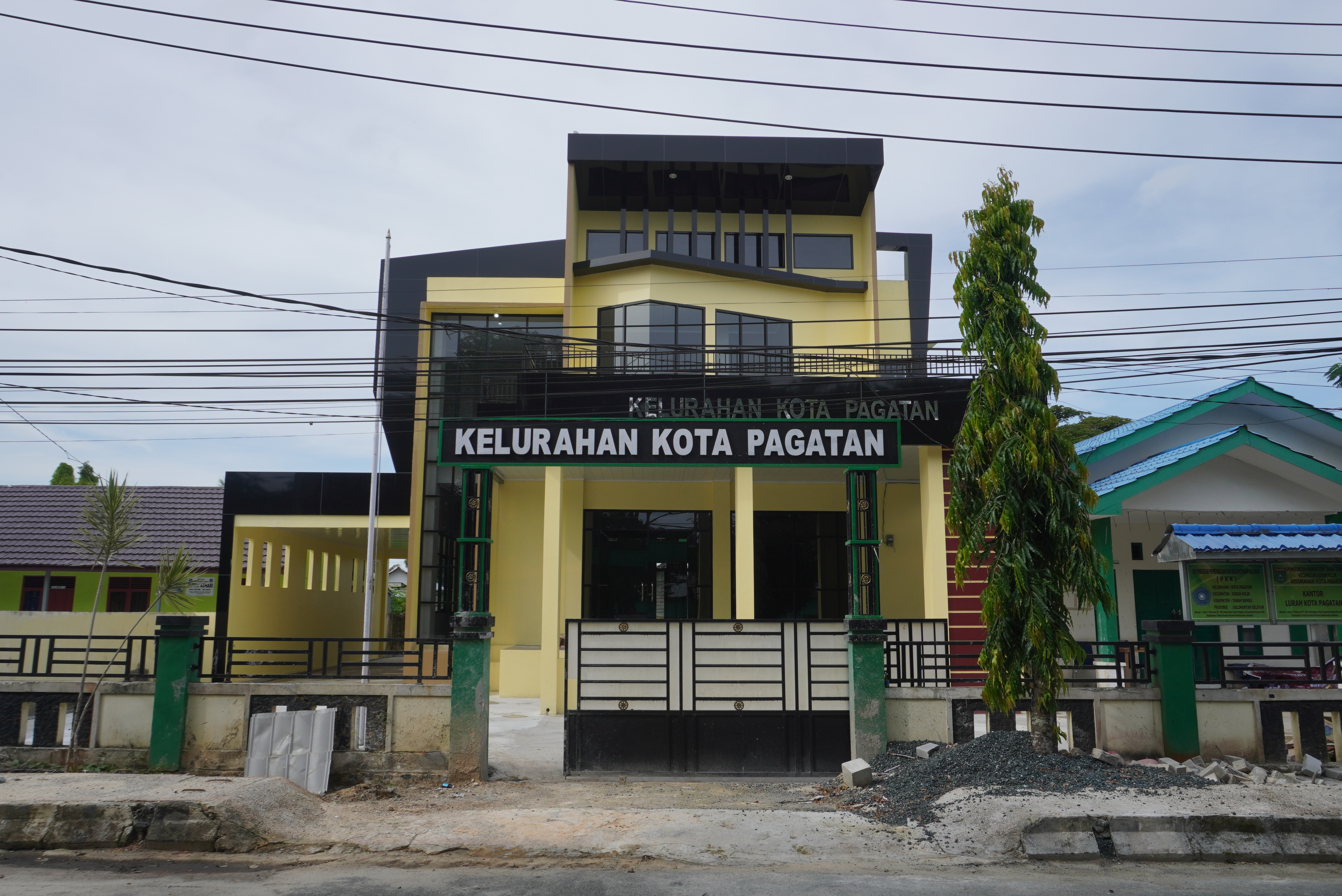
- Kota Pagatan Village Office

- Location within Kalimantan Location within Indonesia
- Coordinates: 3.6076°S 115.9348°E
- Country: Indonesia
- Province: Kalimantan Selatan
- Regency: Tanah Bumbu
- Subdistrict: Kusan Hilir
- Postal code: 72273

Kota Pagatan (other names: Pagattan/Pegattan) is a town located in the Kusan Hilir District, in Tanah Bumbu Regency, Kalimantan Selatan province, Indonesia.

== Landmarks ==
=== Pantai Pagatan ===
Pagatan has an exotic beach, so-called Pagatan Beach. Not only people from this region, but also from Banjarmasin (the capital city of Kalimantan Selatan) visit this place for refreshing and recreation. This place also becomes the place for any cultural event, especially the annual event Mappanre ri tasi'e (Buginese language: sea alms).

== Culture ==
=== Mappanretasi ===
Mappanretasi or currently known as Mappanre ri tasie' is the term used by local people that means to giving alms to the sea. This symbolic terms is intended to appreciate Allah, the God they worship, for the blessing that He has given through the sea and for the safety when they go to the sea for a living. Since they are mostly fishermen, they feel the event as their part of life.

Mappanretasi is held annually in every April. The form of the event is by providing some local food and throwing them to the sea (simply like "feeding" the sea). The Sandro or the leader then deliver some prayers during the activities.
