= Dayak Unity Party =

Ethnic political party in Indonesia (1945–1961)

Dayak Unity Party Partai Persatuan Dayak
- Abbreviation: PPD, PD
- Chairman: Agustinus Jelani (1947–1958)
- Founder: Oevaang Oeray; Franciscus Conradus Palaoensoeka
- Founded: 30 November 1945; 80 years ago
- Dissolved: 1961; 65 years ago
- Preceded by: Dayak in Action
- Merged into: Partindo (Oeray's faction); Catholic Party (Palaoensoeka's faction)
- Headquarters: Putussibau (1945–1946); Pontianak (1946–1961)
- Newspaper: Keadilan (Justice)
- Membership (1947): 50,000

The Dayak Unity Party (Indonesian: Partai Persatuan Dayak, abbreviated as PPD) was a political party in Indonesia. Formed to represent 'primordial' interests of the Dayak people, the party was one few political parties in Indonesia at the time which was formed along ethnic lines. Oevaang Oeray, the first governor of West Kalimantan and one of the founders of the PPD, was a prominent leader of the party.

== Early period ==
On 30 October 1945, the association Daya in Action had been formed in Putussibau. Many of the founders of the movement were teachers, and its leader F.C. Palaunsoeka was a schoolteacher himself. The Javanese pastor A. Adikardjana played an important role in the foundation of the movement. A year after its foundation, the association evolved into the PPD. In October 1946 the Netherlands Indies Civil Administration (NICA) appointed seven PPD members to the West Kalimantan Council (which had 40 seats in total). Half of the members of the administrative board of the West Kalimantan Special Region were from the PPD; Oevaang Oeray, Lim Bak Meng (a Catholic Chinese) and A.F. Korak.

At the time, the PPD took an ambivalent position towards the Dutch. It sought cooperation with NICA in order to strengthen its positions, but did at the same time use opportunities to criticize Dutch 'interference' in Dayak affairs.

== 1955 elections ==
In the 1955 parliamentary election, PPD got 146,054 votes (0.4% of the nationwide vote), and got one seat in the People's Representative Council from West Kalimantan. The party obtained 33.1% of the votes in West Kalimantan, becoming the second largest party in the area (after Masjumi). In South Kalimantan however, the party only got 1.5% of the popular vote (in the Dayak-dominated Central Kalimantan areas the party received 6.2% of the votes). In the election to the West Kalimantan provincial council in the same year, the party won nine out of 29 seats.

== Ban ==
In 1959 President Sukarno issued a ban on ethnic political parties, and the PPD was dissolved after being banned. Some PPD politicians continued their careers in other parties after the ban. Oevaang Oerey joined the Indonesia Party (Partindo), whilst some others joined the Catholic Party.

== See also ==
- Dayak in politics
