= Hungary–Indonesia relations =

- Hungary: Indonesia

Hungary–Indonesia relations refer to bilateral relations between Hungary and Indonesia. The two countries established diplomatic relations on 26 June 1955. A Hungarian embassy was opened in Jakarta in 1957. In line to Hungarian "Eastern Opening" policy, and due to Indonesian political weight and market potentials, Hungary considered Indonesia as one of the most influential states in the ASEAN. While Indonesia sees Hungary as a potential market and a strategic entrance to penetrate the markets of Central Europe and Eastern Europe.

== High level visits ==
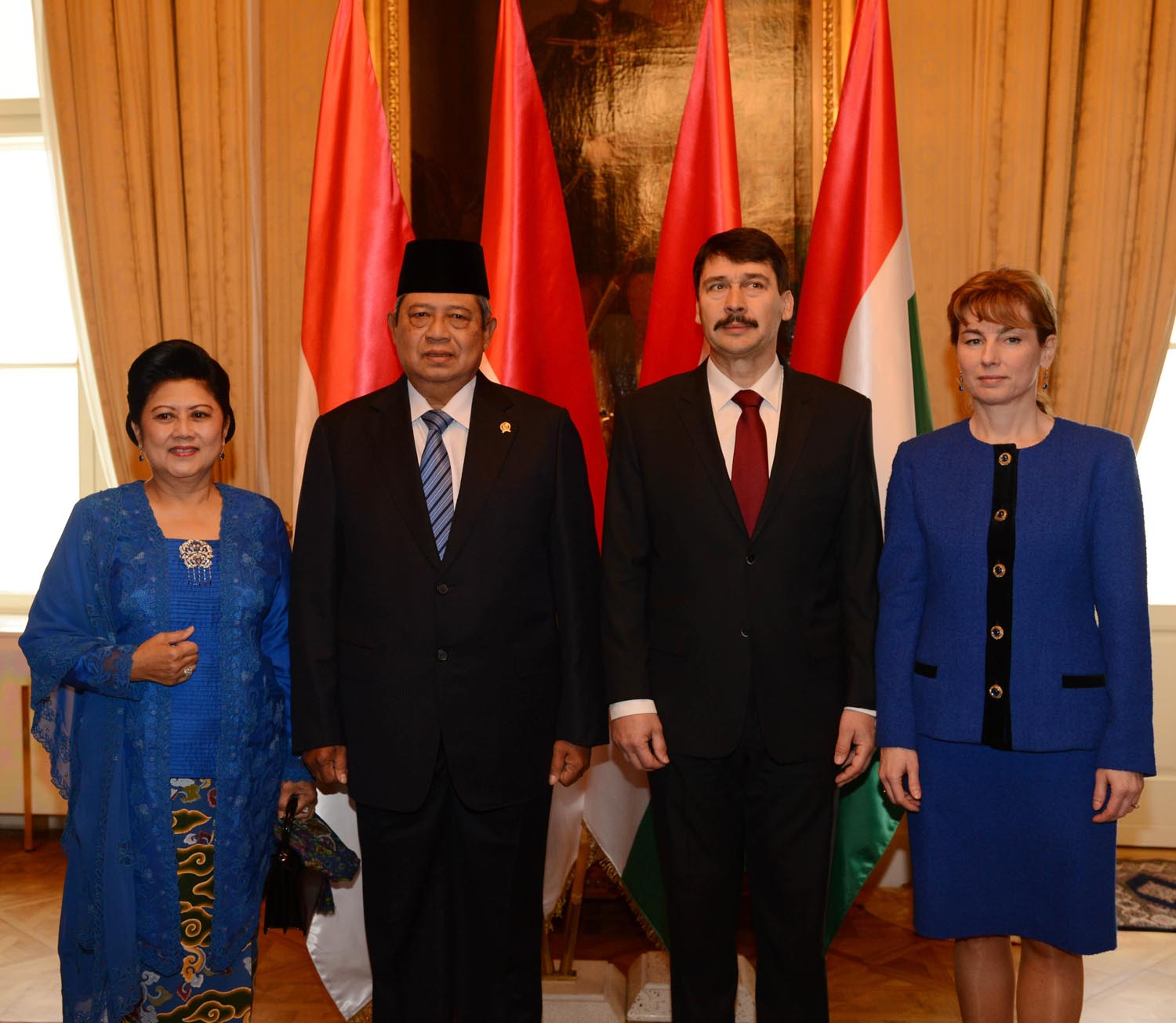
Meeting of Hungarian President János Áder and First Lady Anita Herczegh with Indonesian President Susilo Bambang Yudhoyono and First Lady Ani Yudhoyono in Budapest in 2013

The first president of Indonesia, Sukarno, visited Hungary for the first time in 1960. In September 2002, Indonesian President Megawati Sukarnoputri visited Hungary, while Hungarian Prime Minister Ferenc Gyurcsány paid a state visit to Indonesia in July 2005. In 6–7 March 2013, Indonesian President Susilo Bambang Yudhoyono paid a state visit to Hungary.

In 2016, Hungarian Prime Minister Viktor Orban visited Jakarta leading a delegation of 5 ministers. He met with Indonesian President Joko Widodo.

== Trade and investment ==
The Hungarian–Indonesian Joint Commission on Bilateral Economic Cooperation (JCEC) was established in 1988. Since then, the bilateral trade volume has fluctuated over the years. Bilateral trade grew from US$37 million in 1993 to US$216 million in 2003. However it declined in 2004 by US$126.3 million, US$124.8 million in 2005, US$101.9 million in 2006, and US$114.9 million in 2007. In 2010, the volume of bilateral trade reached US$220.83 million, and rose to US$438.34 million in 2011. However, the economic slowdown that hit Europe caused trade to slump to US$183.5 million for the period of January - October 2012. In 2014, Hungary was Indonesia's fourth biggest trading partners in Central and Eastern Europe. In 2015, total trade between both nations reached USD 103.4 billion.

Indonesian exports to Hungary include rubber and its products, textiles, footwear, palm oil, spices, leather, rattan, plastics and handicrafts, while Hungarian export to Indonesia are pharmaceuticals, chemicals, electric, electronic and optical products, power engineering equipment and machinery.

Hungary's investment in Indonesia was valued at US$400,000 in the period between 1999 and 2009, and in 2014 increased to US$590,000, in five projects.

== Cooperation ==
Other than trade and investment, bilateral cooperation has expanded to various sectors, including cultural exchanges and education, information, technology and engineering, as well as water management, environment and healthcare.

== Resident diplomatic missions ==
- Hungary has an embassy in Jakarta.
- Indonesia has an embassy in Budapest.
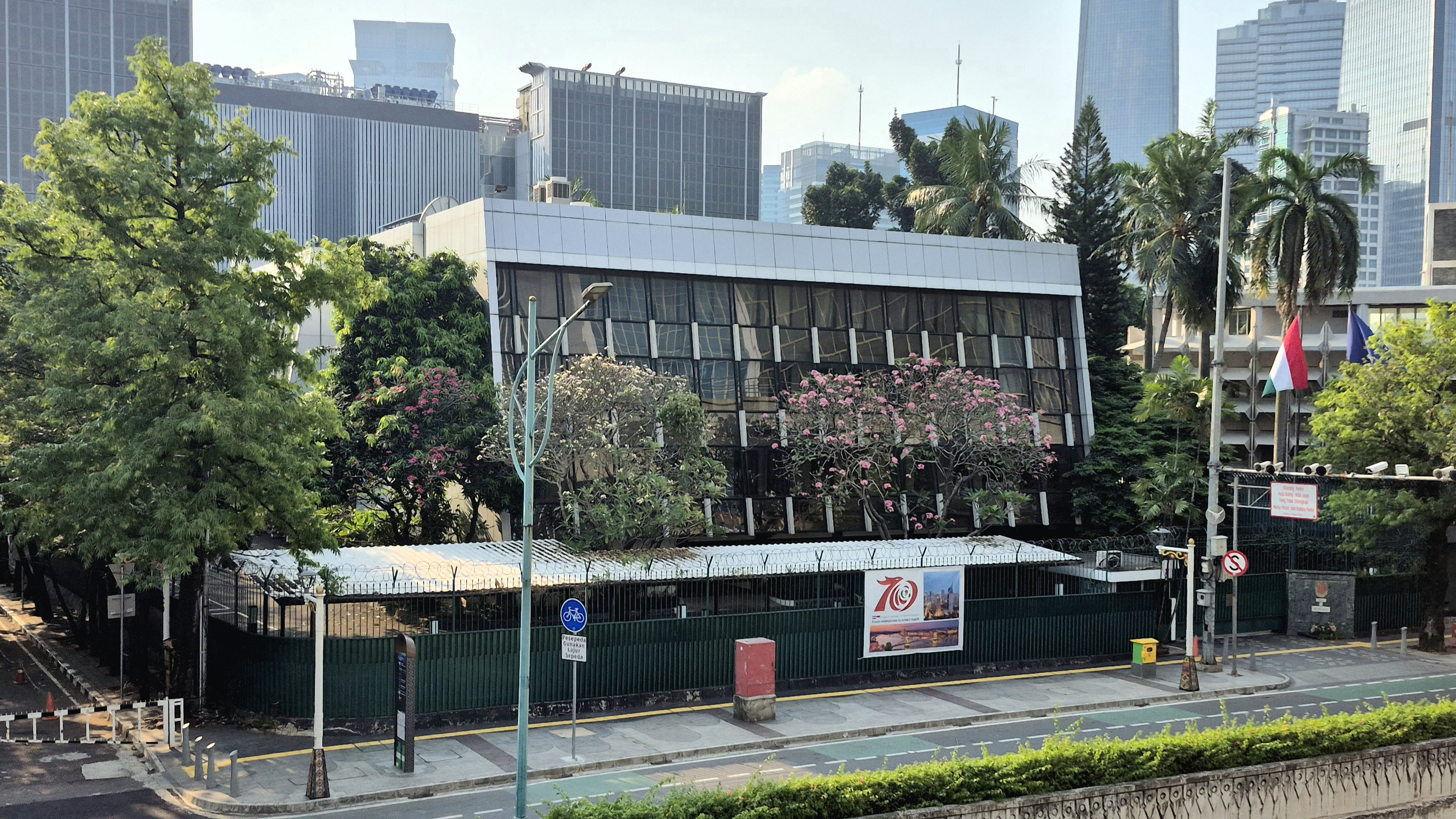
Embassy of Hungary in Jakarta

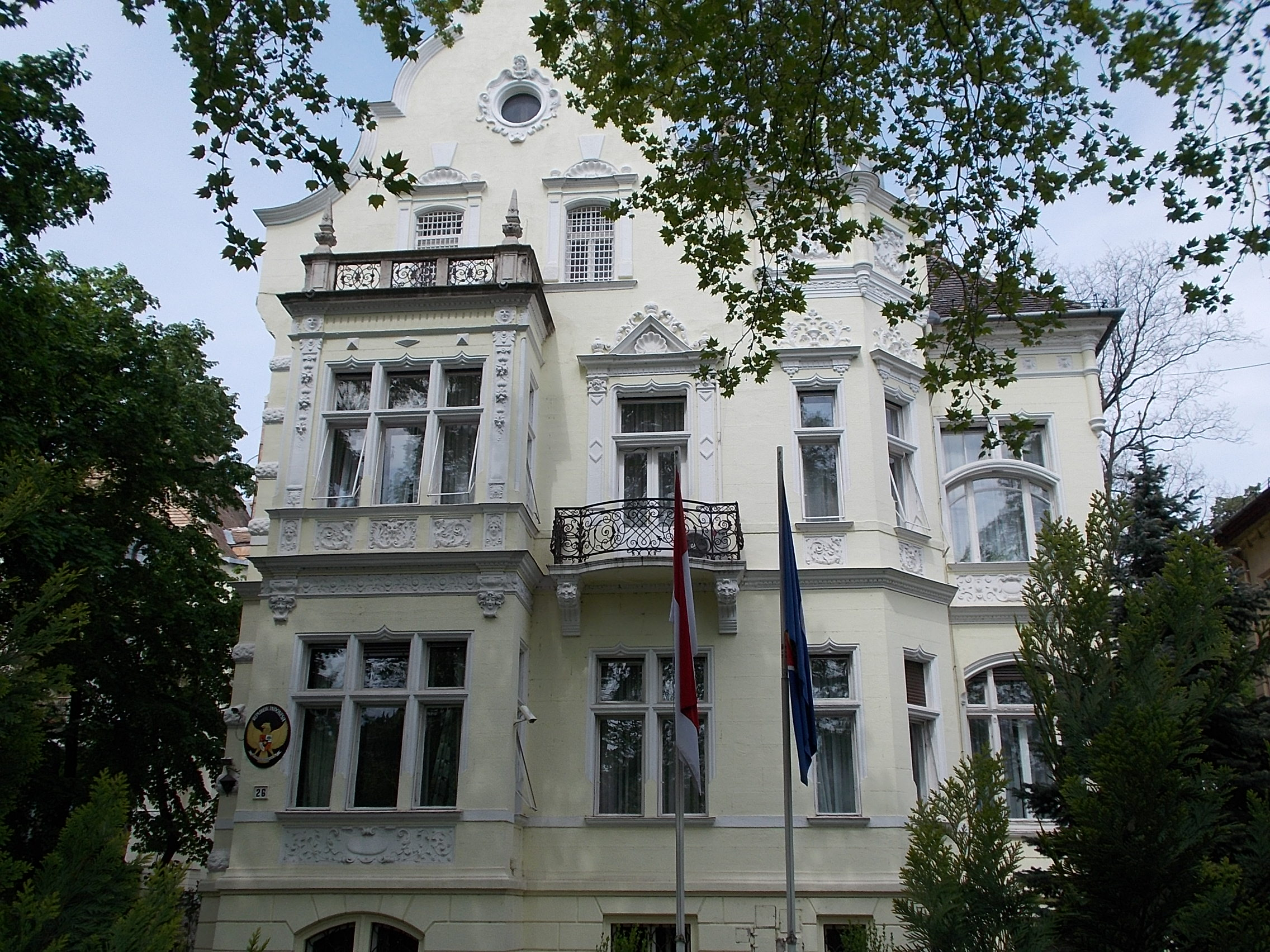
Embassy of Indonesia in Budapest

== See also ==
- Foreign relations of Hungary
- Foreign relations of Indonesia
