= Muhidin Mohamad Said =

Indonesian politician

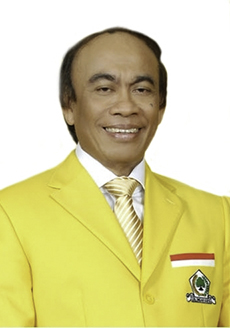
- Said in 2018

Member of the House of Representatives
- Incumbent
- Assumed office 1 October 2004
- Constituency: Central Sulawesi

Member of the People's Consultative Assembly
- In office 1 October 1992 – 1 October 2004
- Parliamentary group: Central Sulawesi representation

Personal details
- Born: 7 October 1950 (age 75) Soppeng, South Sulawesi, Indonesia

Muhidin Mohamad Said (born 7 October 1950) is an Indonesian businessman and politician of the Golkar party who has been a member of the House of Representatives from Central Sulawesi since 2004. He had previously been a regional representation from the province in the People's Consultative Assembly between 1992 and 2004.

== Early life ==
Muhidin Mohamad Said was born on 7 October 1950 in Soppeng, in South Sulawesi. As a child, he had moved to Palu in Central Sulawesi, where he completed his studies at public schools. He graduated from Palu's public high school No. 1 (SMA Negeri 1 Palu) in 1970. He continued to stay in Palu for university, studying economics at Tadulako University between 1971 and 1975.

== Career ==
After graduating from Tadulako, Said entered business, particularly in cocoa bean production and in real estate. He would also lecture at Tadulako's politics and social science faculty.

In the 1980s, he joined Golkar, and in 1992 he was appointed as a regional representative for Central Sulawesi to the People's Consultative Assembly (MPR). He remained a member until 2004, when amendments to the Constitution of Indonesia removed regional representative seats in the MPR. Said instead ran for a Central Sulawesi seat in the House of Representatives (DPR; a constituent of MPR) in the legislative election that year, and was elected. He was reelected for a second DPR term in 2009 with 87,412 votes, a third term in 2014 with 131,508 votes, a fourth in 2019 with 94,779 votes, and a fifth with 154,301 votes in 2024.

In his 2019–2024 and 2024–2029 terms, Said was appointed deputy chairman of DPR's budget commission. He has also been part of the DPR Fifth and Eleventh Commissions. As of 2024, he was the longest-serving incumbent national legislator in Indonesia. (Note: Another Golkar legislator, Ferdiansyah, has served six consecutive terms since 1999 in DPR, but did not serve in MPR before then. Another legislator, Guruh Sukarnoputra, began his term also in 1992, but did not run for reelection in 2024.) Kompas in 2024 compared the length of his tenure at MPR and DPR with the presidency of Suharto, which lasted 32 years.

Said in his 2014–2019 term led the creation of a Construction Services law, which regulated a minimum standard of payment for construction workers, and also pushed for a water resources law which regulated private water usage. In 2021, he voiced his concern over the growth in cryptocurrency transactions in Indonesia, citing associated illegal activities.

== Personal life ==
Said is married to Sri Sulistiasti, and the couple has five children. He has a history of hypertension. In one DPR budget meeting in June 2022, he collapsed in front of the assembly after delivering a report, although he recovered after receiving treatment from the legislature's medical team.
