= Surnames of illegitimate children =

There were different traditions for surnames of illegitimate children.

"Fitz": There is an erroneous belief that the prefix "Fitz", denoted illegitimacy, although prominent cases of this type did exist among aristocracy, which probably gave rise to this belief.

Russian surnames of illegitimate children were in some cases derived from father's surname by truncation of the first syllable, e.g., Trubetskoy was trimmed to Betskoy, while in other cases the new surname had no relation to parents' ones. In a number of cases illegitimate children received the surname of the adopting parent, as was in the case, e.g., prominent Russian poet Vasily Zhukovsky.

In Dutch East Indies "unchristian children" or European men could have been legitimized by adoption and often were given distorted (reversed or mangled) surnames: Ednenov (Von Ende), Mangold (Goldman), Nessnarc (Cranssen), Kijdsmeir (Van Riemsdijk), Snitsevorg (Grovestins), Rhemrev (Vermehr), Stopkeerb (Breekpot), Tenret (Ternet), Vodegel (De Vogel), and Zowran (Von Ranzow)".

== See also ==
- Category:Illegitimate children of royalty
