= Batamad =

Paramilitary of Indonesia

Batamad, abbreviation from Barisan Pertahanan Masyarakat Adat Dayak (Indigenous Dayak Defense Line), is an official paramilitary under National Dayak Customary Council in Indonesia. It was established in February 2012 with approval of Central Kalimantan provincial government based on Regional Law Number 16 of 2008. Initially, it was created as a response of rising religious extremism in Indonesia, including Central Kalimantan, and the paramilitary was tasked to supervise suspicious religious activities there, particularly those allegedly by Islamic extremism. Other than that, the organization is also tasked to enforce customary laws under Dayak culture, enforcing tribal land claims, as well as protecting rights of Dayak people. It is proposed in 2018 by Central Kalimantan province that the organization would also act as a security personnels during tribal courts. However, outside of its given legal authorities, the organization also participate in enforcing road traffic with Indonesian National Police. The organization has been descibred by local media as an "official tribal police".

According to regional laws, it is defined as "groups from parts of Dayak societies that is also part of cultural commissions as also part of National Dayak Customary Council". It also expected to operate under regional branches of National Dayak Customary Council as well as local governments in Central Kalimantan. The organization is divided into several brigades in each regencies of Central Kalimantan, which all under command of a province-wide commander (panglima) and has close ties to Indonesian military. It also runs a cooperative, Batamad Muda Sejahtera which is used to make extra funds for its activities. The organization itself denies the sentiment that they are a mass organization, but rather a cultural body.

The organization was vocal on demanding disbandment of Islamic Defenders Front, which were disbanded in late 2020.

The current panglima of the paramilitary as of 2022 was a retired Indonesian Army Brigadier General Pur Yuandrias.

== Formation ==
- Central Kalimantan Command
  - Murung Raya Brigade
  - Lamandau Brigade
  - Katingan Brigade
  - Kapuas Brigade
  - Palangka Raya Brigade
  - Gunung Mas Brigade
  - East Kotawaringin Brigade
  - West Kotawaringin Brigade
- South Kalimantan Command
  - Banjarmasin Brigade
  - Banjarbaru Brigade
  - Barito Kuala Brigade

== Gallery ==
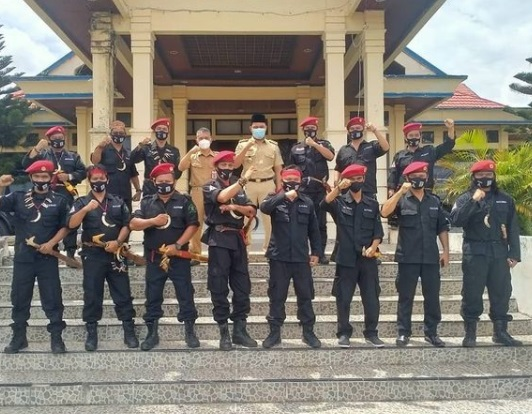
Batamad high-ranking officials with Regent and Vice Regent of Lamandau Regency

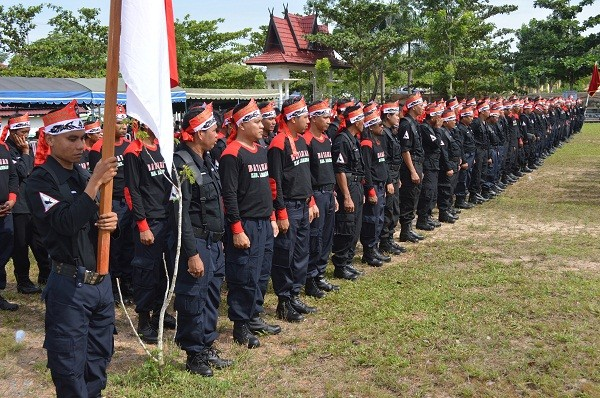
Batamad regular personnels lined up
