= Banjar Region =

1948–1950 Dutch client state then autonomous region of Indonesia

Banjar Region Daerah Banjar
- State-level autonomous region of Indonesia
- 1948–1950
- Flag

- Banjar in the United States of Indonesia
- Government
- President (government title)
  - 1948−1950: Mohammad Hanafiah
- Historical era: Cold War
  - Established: 14 January 1948
  - Disestablished: 4 April 1950
Preceded by	Succeeded by
Republic of Indonesia	South Kalimantan

Banjar Region (Indonesian: Daerah Banjar, old spelling Bandjar) was an autonomous area formed in the southeastern part of Indonesian island of Borneo by the Netherlands in 1948 as part of an attempt to re-establish the colony of the Dutch East Indies during the Indonesian National Revolution. Banjar became a constituent part of the United States of Indonesia in 1949. The chairman of the Banjar Council was Mohammed Hanafiah. The region was dissolved on 4 April 1950 and combined with Great Dayak and the Southeast Borneo Federation to form Kalimantan Province. Today, the territory of the former region comprises around two thirds of South Kalimantan Province.

== Person of interests ==
- M. Hanafiah
- Idham Chalid
