= Soejadi =

Raden Adipati Aria Soejadi
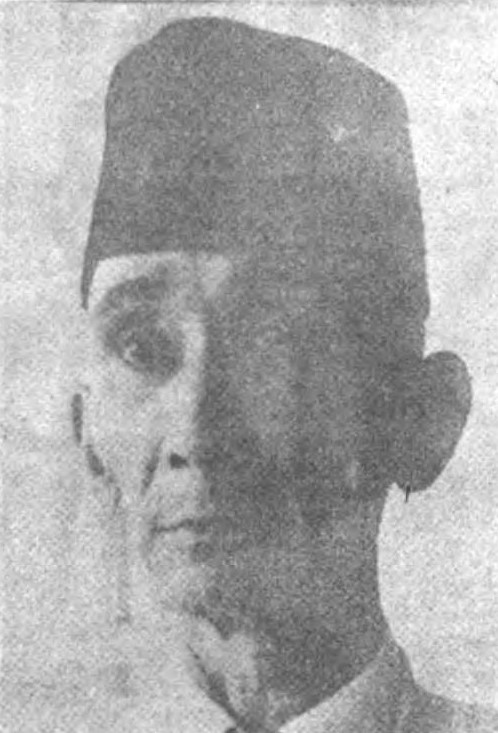

Member of the Provisional People's Representative Council
- In office 16 August 1950 – 23 November 1953

United States of Indonesia Senator
- In office 16 February 1950 – 16 August 1950

Regent of Sidoarjo
- In office 27 September 1933 – 16 February 1950
- Preceded by: Position established
- Succeeded by: R. Suriadi Kertosuprojo

Personal details
- Born: 3 January 1888 Surakarta Sunanate, Dutch East Indies
- Died: 23 November 1953 (aged 65) Surabaya, East Java, Indonesia

Soejadi (3 January 1888 – 23 November 1953) was an Indonesian aristocrat and politician who served as the Regent of Sidoarjo, United States of Indonesia senator from East Java, and member of the Provisional People's Representative Council

== Early life ==
Soejadi was born on 3 January 1888 in the Surakarta Sunanate, which at that time was part of the Dutch East Indies. Soejadi began his education at the Hollandsche-Indische School (HIS) and Opleiding School Voor Inlandsche Ambtenaren (OSVIA). He graduated from OSVIA in 1909.

== Career ==
From 1909 until 1910, Soejadi was appointed the Mantri (employee) for agriculture, and from 1910 until 1912, he was appointed a Mantripolitie (indigenous civil servant). After that, from 1912 until 1917, Soejadi became the Asisten Wedana (subdistrict head) in Panekan, Magelang. From 1917 until 1918, Soejadi began his brief career in the judiciary. He became an adjunct (deputy) prosecutor and as a Fiscaal-Griffier (tax clerk). After that, Soejadi returned to his previous job as a civil servant. Soejadi went back to study in Bestuurschool (Dutch school for civil servants) from 1918 until 1920.

After he graduated from the Bestuurschool, Soejadi was reappointed a subdistrict head Ponorogo from 1920. He was promoted in 1921 and became the Wedana (district head) in Ngawi and Madiun from 1921 and 1927. He was promoted again in 1927 and became the Patih (regency secretary) of Madiun.

On 27 September 1933, Soejadi became the Regent of Ponorogo. The office was held until his appointment as a senator on 16 February 1950.

After the dissolution of the United States of Indonesia, the senate was dissolved. All senators automatically became members of the Provisional People's Representative Council. Soejadi was inaugurated for the office on 16 August 1950.

== Death ==
Soejadi died on 23 November 1953 in Surabaya.

== Personal life ==
Soejadi was married to Raden Ayu Adipati Aryo Soesilawati-Soejadi. The couple had 7 children.

== Bibliography ==
- Tim Penyusun Sejarah (1970), Seperempat Abad Dewan Perwakilan Rakjat Republik Indonesia [A Quarter Century of the People's Representative Council of the Republic of Indonesia] (PDF) (in Indonesian), Jakarta: Sekretariat DPR-GR
- Gunseikanbu (1944). Orang Indonesia jang Terkemoeka di Djawa.
- Sutherland, Heather (April 1974), "Notes on Java's Regent Families: Part II" (PDF), Indonesia, 17 (17), Cornell University Southeast Asia Program: 1–42, doi:10.2307/3350770, hdl:1813/53573, JSTOR 3350770
- Widodo, Dukut Imam; Nurcahyo, Henri (August 2013), Sidoardjo tempo doeloe, Pemkab Sidoardjo
