= Franciscus Conradus Palaoensoeka =

Indonesian Dayak politician

Franciscus Conradus Palaunsoeka
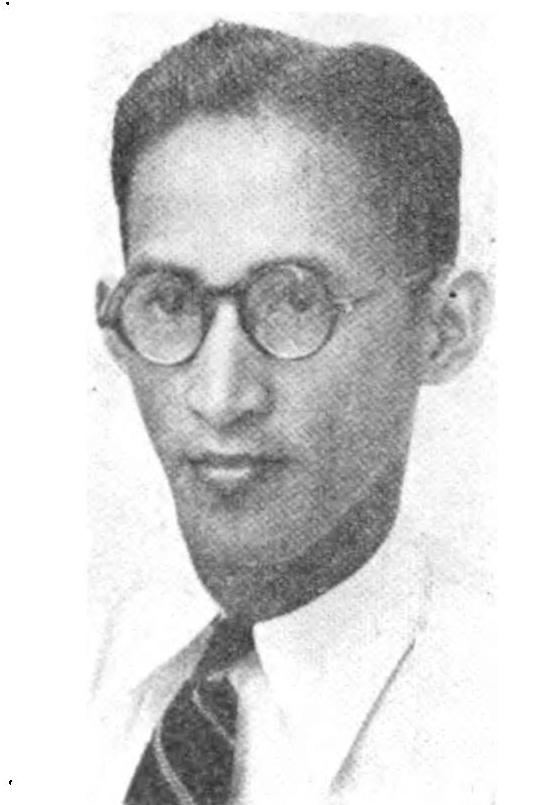

Member of the West Borneo Council
- In office 1948–1950
- President: Sukarno

Member of the People's Representative Council
- In office 16 August 1950 – 26 March 1988
- President: Sukarno; Suharto

Chairman of the Dayak Unity Party
- In office 13 October 1958 – 5 July 1960 (Note: De jure dissolution of the party, according to the date on the Presidential Decree Number 13/1960)
- Preceded by: Agustinus Djelani
- Succeeded by: party dissolved

Personal details
- Born: May 19, 1922 Melapi, South Putussibau, Kapuas Hulu Regency, West Kalimantan, Dutch East Indies
- Died: August 12, 1993 (aged 71) Pontianak, West Kalimantan, Indonesia
- Party: Dayak Unity Party (1946–1960); Catholic Party (1960-1973); Indonesian Democratic Party (1973-1993)

Franciscus Conradus Palaoensoeka (19 May 1922 – 12 August 1993) was an Indonesian politician. A long-standing member of the People's Representative Council, he served for eleven terms (Note: The terms of the People's Representative Council can be seen on .) from 1950 until 1988. He also served as a member of the West Borneo Council from 1948 until 1950.

He was also the Chairman of the Dayak Unity Party from 1958 until its dissolution and ran for the Governor of West Kalimantan in 1967. He lost the election to Overste Soemadi.
