= Southeast Borneo Federation =

1947–1950 Dutch client state then autonomous region of Indonesia

- 1947–1950 (sovereign state until 1949)
- Historical era: Cold War
  - Established: January 1947
  - Disestablished: 18 April 1950 (sovereign state until 1949)

Southeast Borneo Federation (Indonesian: Federasi Kalimantan Tenggara) was an autonomous area formed in the southeastern part of Indonesian island of Borneo by the Netherlands in 1948 as part of an attempt to re-establish the colony of the Dutch East Indies during the Indonesian National Revolution. Southeast Borneo became a constituent part of the United States of Indonesia in 1949. The Federation was dissolved on 18 April 1950 and combined with Great Dayak and Bandjar to form South Kalimantan Province.

== Person of interests ==
- Mohammad Jamani

== See also ==
- History of Indonesia
- Indonesian National Revolution
- Indonesian regions
