= Sumitro Djojohadikusumo =

Indonesian statesman and economist (1917–2001)

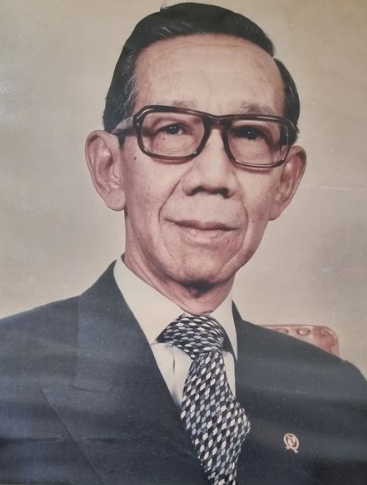
- Official portrait, 1973

State Minister of Research
- In office 28 March 1973 – 29 March 1978
- President: Suharto
- Preceded by: Suhadi Reksowardojo (Note: as Minister of National Research Agency (1966).)
- Succeeded by: Bacharuddin Jusuf Habibie

Minister of Trade
- In office 6 June 1968 – 28 March 1973
- President: Suharto
- Preceded by: Mohammad Jusuf
- Succeeded by: Radius Prawiro
- In office 6 September 1950 – 27 April 1951 (Note: as Minister of Trade and Industry.)
- Prime Minister: Mohammad Natsir
- Preceded by: Tandiono Manu
- Succeeded by: Sujono Hadinoto

Minister of Finance
- In office 12 August 1955 – 24 March 1956
- Prime Minister: Burhanuddin Harahap
- Preceded by: Ong Eng Die
- Succeeded by: Jusuf Wibisono
- In office 3 April 1952 – 30 July 1953
- Prime Minister: Wilopo
- Preceded by: Jusuf Wibisono
- Succeeded by: Ong Eng Die

Personal details
- Born: 27 May 1917 Gombong, Central Java, Dutch East Indies
- Died: 9 March 2001 (aged 83) Jakarta, Indonesia
- Resting place: Karet Bivak Cemetery
- Party: Socialist (1950–1960)
- Spouse: Dora Marie Sigar (m. 1945)
- Children: 4, including Prabowo Subianto and Hashim Djojohadikusumo
- Parents: Margono Djojohadikusumo (father); Siti Katoemi Wirodihardjo (mother)
- Relatives: Sudradjad Djiwandono (son-in-law)
- Education: Netherlands School of Economics; Sorbonne University
- Occupation: Politician; economist
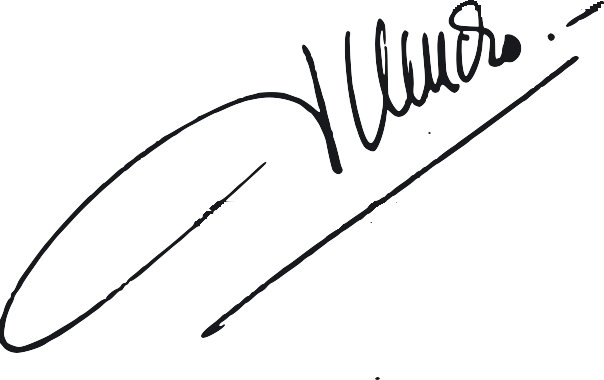
- Signature

Sumitro Djojohadikusumo (EVO: Soemitro Djojohadikoesoemo; 27 May 1917 – 9 March 2001) was an Indonesian statesman and one of the country's most influential economists. He held ministerial positions under Presidents Sukarno and Suharto intermittently between 1950 and 1978. During his career in government, Sumitro served as minister of industry and trade, minister of finance, and the minister of research in five different cabinets. He was also the dean of the Faculty of Economics at the University of Indonesia.

Born into a Javanese family, he studied economics at the Netherlands School of Economics in Rotterdam in the Netherlands and remained there throughout World War II. Returning to Indonesia after the war, he was assigned to the country's diplomatic mission in the United States, where he sought to raise funds and garner international attention in the struggle against Dutch colonialism. After the handover of sovereignty as a result of the 1949 Dutch–Indonesian Round Table Conference, in which he took part, he joined the Socialist Party and became Minister for Trade and Industry in the Natsir Cabinet. He implemented the protectionist Benteng program, and developed an economic plan which aimed for national industrialization. Sumitro further served as finance minister in the cabinets of Prime Ministers Wilopo and Burhanuddin Harahap during the Sukarno era. During the 1950s, Sumitro favoured foreign investment, an unpopular position at that time which brought him into conflict with the nationalists and communists.

Due to political differences and allegations of corruption, Sumitro fled Jakarta and joined the insurrectionary Revolutionary Government of the Republic of Indonesia in the late 1950s. Considered a leader of the movement, he operated from abroad, liaising with Western foreign intelligence organizations while seeking funds and international support. After the movement's defeat, Sumitro remained in exile as a vocal critic of Sukarno, continuing to agitate for the downfall of the government. After the overthrow of Sukarno and the establishment of the New Order under Suharto, Sumitro was invited to return from exile and in 1967 was appointed Minister of Trade. In this position Sumitro set policies favouring industrialization through imports of capital goods and export restrictions of raw materials. He was involved in the high-level planning of Indonesia's economy, along with many of his former students from the University of Indonesia.

After disagreements with Suharto on policy in the early 1970s, Sumitro was reassigned as minister of research before his removal from government posts altogether. Throughout the New Order, Sumitro leveraged his foreign and political connections to establish substantial private business interests and a political presence for his family. As his son Prabowo Subianto joined the military and married Suharto's daughter, Sumitro also continued to work as an economist with some influence during the 1980s. In the leadup to the 1997 Asian financial crisis, he began to call for greater deregulation of the economy but remained committed to the political structure of the New Order. Following his death, his children and grandchildren remain influential in Indonesian politics, with his son Prabowo becoming the eighth president of Indonesia in 2024.

== Early life ==
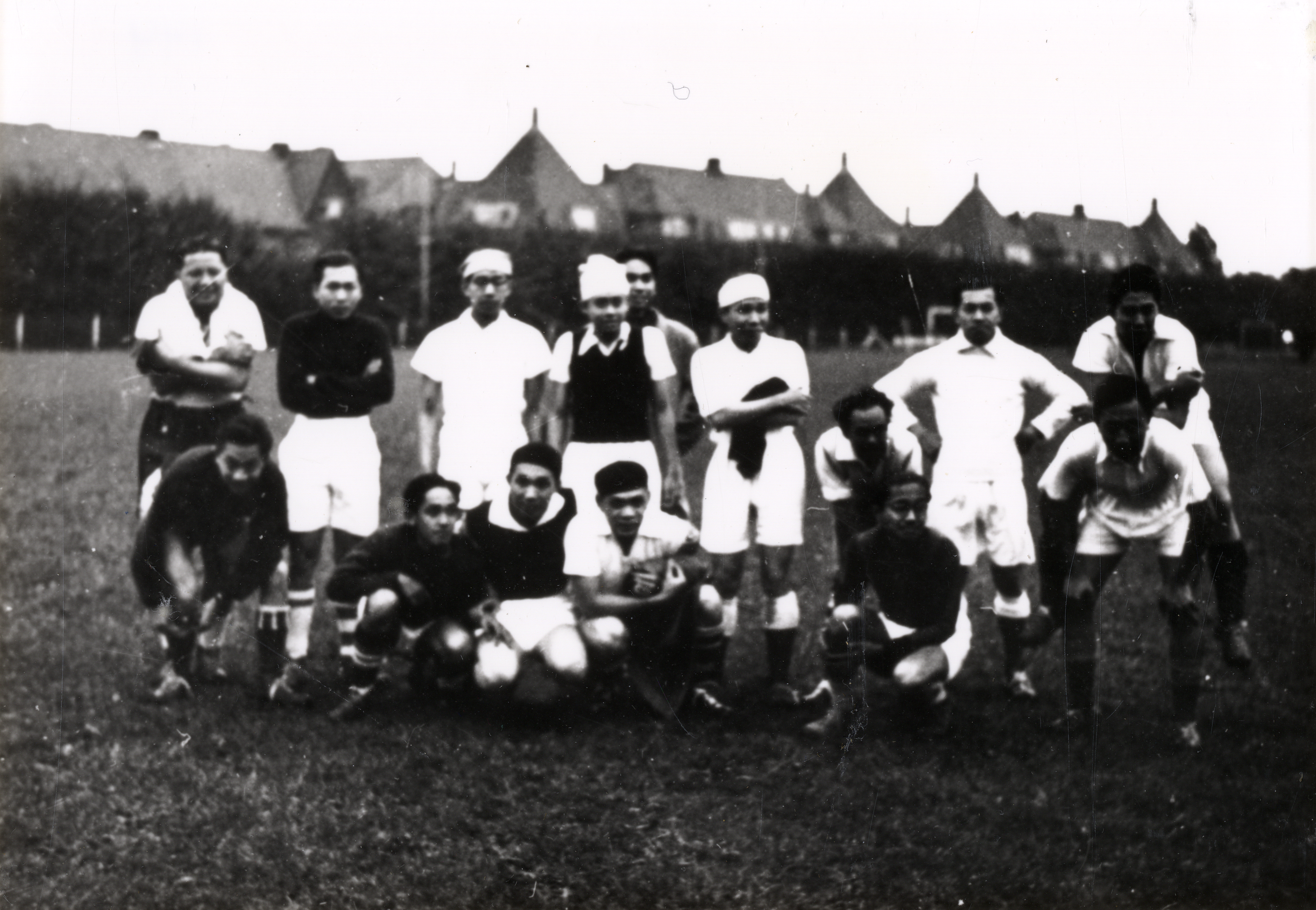
Sumitro (standing, third from left) in an Indonesian student football team, 1939

Sumitro was born in Kebumen on 27 May 1917. He was the eldest child of Margono Djojohadikusumo, a high ranking civil servant in the colonial government of the Dutch East Indies and later founder of Bank Negara Indonesia, and Siti Katoemi Wirodihardjo. The Djojohadikusumo family was part of the Javanese aristocracy's lower rungs. He studied at a Europeesche Lagere School (a school typically serving European children), then an Opleiding School Voor Inlandsche Ambtenaren (a school for native Indonesians going into the civil service) in Banyumas.

After finishing secondary education in 1935, he commenced tertiary studies at the Netherlands School of Economics in Rotterdam. Obtaining his bachelor's degree in 1937, he then took a one-year course in philosophy and history at Sorbonne University. In his autobiography Sumitro claimed that he wanted to join the International Brigades in the Spanish Civil War and had briefly joined a training camp in Catalonia, but he was rejected because he was too young. In a 1986 recollection, Sumitro stated that he instead began to fundraise for the cause of Republican Spain. During his studies, he joined an Indonesian students' organization which aimed to promote Indonesian arts and culture.

He was completing his dissertation at Rotterdam in May 1940 when German forces invaded the Netherlands, and during the Rotterdam Blitz he was nearly killed by a Luftwaffe bomb which destroyed one of the walls to his room. He still completed his dissertation, "The People's Credit Service during the Depression", and earned his doctorate in 1943. This made him the first Indonesian to earn a PhD in economics. During the later stages of the war in Europe, after the conclusion of his studies, he helped provide aid to stranded Indonesian sailors in Rotterdam. Meanwhile, the Perhimpoenan Indonesia student association (which Sumitro was not part of) took part in the Dutch resistance mostly by distributing anti-Nazi pamphlets. Before the war, Sumitro had decided not to join the association due to the presence of communists such as Abdulmadjid Djojoadiningrat. Unable to return to Indonesia during wartime, he spent his time studying the Indonesian economy.

== National Revolution ==
=== Early revolution ===
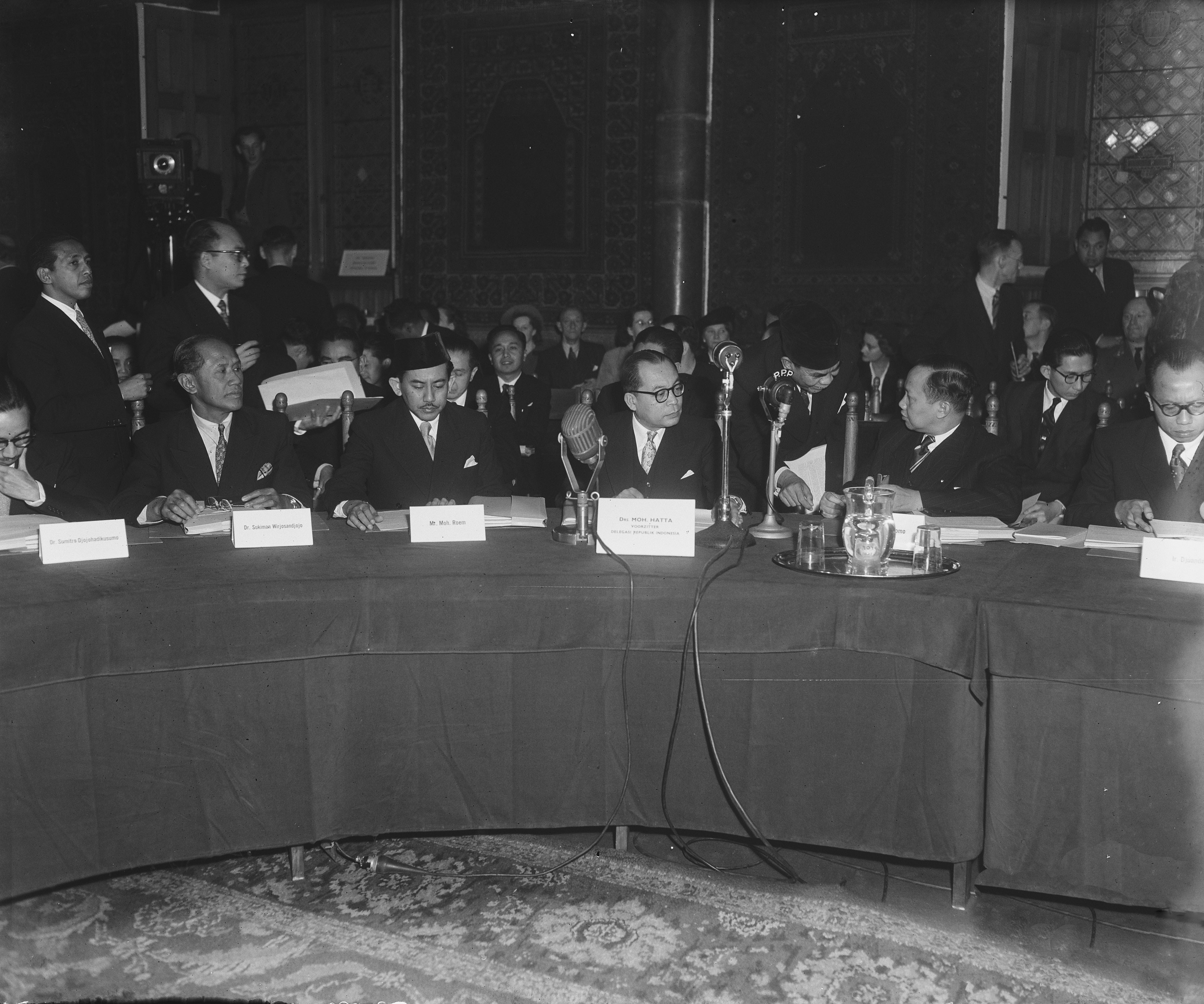
Sumitro (seated, far left) during the Dutch–Indonesian Round Table Conference in 1949

After the end of World War II Sukarno proclaimed Indonesian independence on 17 August 1945. Sumitro briefly joined a Dutch delegation taking part in the first United Nations Security Council (UNSC) meeting in London in January 1946 as an advisor to Dutch foreign minister Eelco van Kleffens. According to British reports, Sumitro had been included in the delegation to provide a good impression for the Dutch government, but he became disillusioned and decided to return to his home country. An Indonesian report, in contrast, stated that Sumitro did not act in support of the restoration of Dutch rule and had attended the meeting to assess the international mood regarding Indonesian independence. During that meeting, Ukraine, the Soviet Union, and Egypt proposed a draft resolution calling for UN involvement in Indonesia, but this was rejected – Sumitro believed this was due to the lack of an Indonesian delegation in the meeting. Sumitro's brief experience at the Security Council allowed him to inform other Indonesian nationalists about its procedures, once he returned to Java in March 1946.

He joined the newly formed government of the Republic of Indonesia which had declared itself independent from Dutch colonial rule with Sukarno as president. Sumitro became an assistant to Prime Minister Sutan Sjahrir and later worked at the Ministry of Finance. By this time Dutch forces under the Netherlands Indies Civil Administration had returned to Indonesia to retake control, but they had managed to hold only several coastal cities at first. In late June 1946, Sumitro was part of Sjahrir's entourage in Surakarta when the group was kidnapped by disgruntled army units led by Major General Sudarsono, commander of a division within the Indonesian Army. During the political wrangling and coup attempt that followed, the group was relocated to Yogyakarta; their kidnappers planned to force Sukarno to remove Sjahrir and appoint a new cabinet, as Sudarsono considered Sjahrir's diplomatic approaches to the Dutch to be too lenient. Due to a botched attempt to kidnap another minister, Amir Sjarifuddin, most of Sudarsono's soldiers failed to show up to Sukarno's palace, only the prisoners and a handful of troops being there with Sudarsono. Sukarno refused the demands, Sudarsono was arrested, and Sjahrir along with his group were released.

Later in 1946 Sumitro was assigned to the Indonesian observer delegation to the United Nations as deputy chief of mission and minister plenipotentiary for economic affairs, while he unofficially engaged in fundraising. He would remain in this posting until 1950. With the ongoing revolution, the Dutch had banned the shipment of goods to or any exports of agricultural products from ports controlled by Republican forces. In effect, this was an embargo on Indonesian-controlled territories, and Sumitro was charged with bypassing it. On one occasion in 1947, American cargo ship SS Martin Behrman carrying cargo from the Indonesian-controlled city of Cirebon was seized by Dutch marines. Sumitro had arranged the ship's voyage despite expecting a Dutch seizure, as the delegation calculated that the media attention would be invaluable. The ship's seizure prompted anger from the National Maritime Union, and a US congressional investigation was considered, until it was released. Sumitro quoted Sjahrir as saying "we lost $3 million of cargo, but we couldn't have paid for the public attention." While in the United States, Sumitro also signed a contract with American businessman Matthew Fox to form the Indonesian–American corporation, an agent for bilateral trade of several commodities between the two countries with a ten-year licence.

=== Diplomatic talks ===
Following the 1948 Operation Kraai, a large-scale Dutch offensive against Republican-held territories which captured most of the Indonesian leadership, Sumitro and members of the Indonesian UN delegation (led by L. N. Palar) were vital in maintaining international awareness of the Indonesian situation. Previously the Indonesian delegation had been ignored, but the military operation brought Indonesia to the forefront of attention, and after a meeting with Under Secretary of State Robert A. Lovett, Sumitro gave a press conference which was prominently featured in American media. The New York Times, for example, published in its entirety a memorandum from Sumitro condemning Dutch actions and calling for the cessation of American aid (i.e. the Marshall Plan) to the Netherlands. Sumitro later headed the Indonesian embassy in the United States as a charge d'affaires ad interim, serving from 9 January until the presentation of credentials by the inaugural ambassador Ali Sastroamidjojo on 20 February 1950.

During the final negotiations on the handover of Indonesian sovereignty Sumitro led the economic and financial subcommittee. In these negotiations, while the Dutch calculated that the Indonesians would have to take on debt passed on from the Dutch East Indies government amounting to over 6 billion guilders, Sumitro argued the opposite: that a significant proportion of the debts (around 2 billion guilders) were created to fund the Dutch effort against Indonesian forces during the revolution and hence should not be paid by the Indonesian government. Instead, he calculated that the Dutch government would owe Indonesia 500 million guilders. The Dutch eventually agreed to not include the military spending, and an agreement was struck that the Indonesian government would be responsible for 4.3 billion guilders in debt (then equivalent to US$1.13 billion) to be paid in full by July 1964. Sumitro wanted to negotiate down the debt further, but was overridden by Vice President Mohammad Hatta. Hatta further overrode Sumitro on the question of sovereignty over Western New Guinea, and on the selection of De Javasche Bank, the colonial central bank, as Indonesia's central bank over the nationalist Bank Negara Indonesia (founded by his father Margono in 1946).

== Cabinet minister ==
=== Minister of industry and academia ===
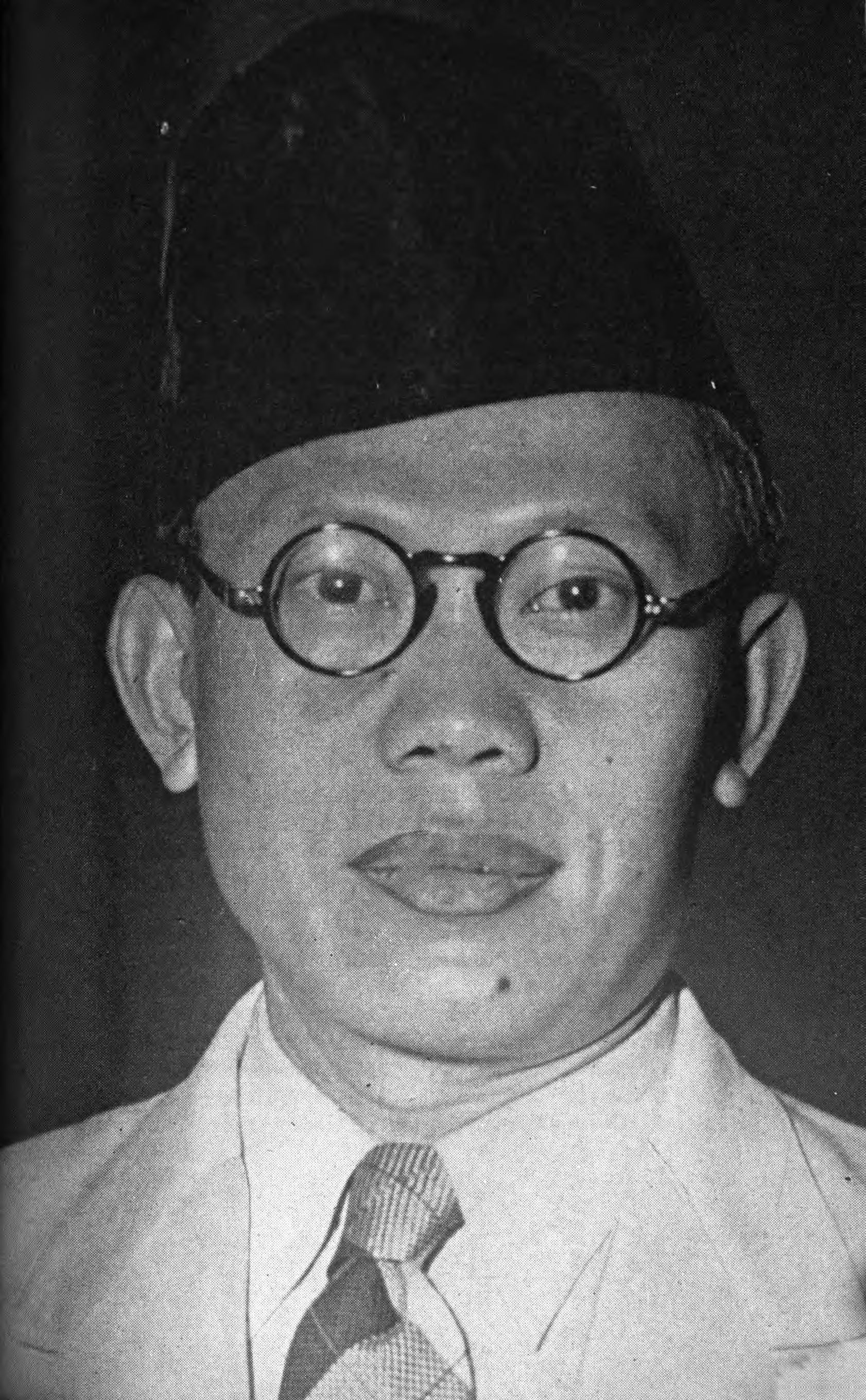
Portrait of Finance Minister Sjafruddin Prawiranegara, c. 1952

After the handover of sovereignty, Sumitro briefly served as the director general of planning at the Department of Economic Affairs, being appointed to the position on 30 December 1949. He was then appointed as Minister of Trade and Industry in the newly formed Natsir Cabinet as a member of Sutan Sjahrir's Socialist Party of Indonesia (PSI). (Note: Sumitro's brother, Subianto, had been one of Sjahrir's followers during the Japanese occupation of the Dutch East Indies.) He replaced Tandiono Manu who served in the previous Halim Cabinet. Natsir's cabinet was sworn in on 6 September 1950. Contrary to the views of Finance Minister Sjafruddin Prawiranegara who focused on agricultural development, Sumitro viewed industrialization as necessary to develop Indonesia's then-agrarian economy. Sumitro introduced the "Economic Urgency Plan" which aimed to restore industrial facilities that had been damaged by the Japanese invasion and the subsequent war of independence. The plan, sometimes called the "Sumitro Plan", was published in April 1951 (after he left office) and called for the use of government funds to develop industrial facilities across Java and Sumatra. Although the plan was continued under the succeeding Sukiman and Wilopo Cabinets, neither managed to complete it within its two-year timeline, and the duration of the plan was extended to three years.

In the early 1950s Sumitro also toured the Netherlands and other European countries to secure investments establishing manufacturing facilities in Indonesia. He initiated the Benteng program, an import control scheme benefitting indigenous Indonesian businessmen at the expense of the Chinese Indonesian mercantile class, despite his own preference for a free market system for imports. After the collapse of the Natsir Cabinet on 27 April 1951, Sumitro did not receive a ministerial appointment in the succeeding Sukiman Cabinet, Sujono Hadinoto taking his office. Sumitro then became dean of the economics faculty at the University of Indonesia (UI) after its first dean Sunarjo Kolopaking had resigned. He served in this academic position between 1951 and 1957, and in this position he recruited Dutch academics to cover the lack of native Indonesian teachers in the faculty. He also founded the Institute of Economic and Social Research (Lembaga Penyelidikan Ekonomi dan Masyarakat), which he would later use to develop economic policies when he returned to government. He also arranged for an affiliate program between the faculty and the department of economics at University of California, Berkeley. (Note: He had also considered the London School of Economics, but the plan was scrapped due to the British Council's refusal to grant scholarships.)

During the 1950s, Sumitro along with Mohammad Hatta had also established the Indonesian Association of Economists (Ikatan Sarjana Ekonomi Indonesia). To broaden the knowledge of Indonesian economists, whose education at that time was still dominated by European curricula, Sumitro arranged for an exchange program sponsored by the Ford Foundation whereby American professors would teach in Indonesia and Indonesian students would spend several years in the United States. In mid-1951, he also invited Hjalmar Schacht, the former finance minister of Nazi Germany, to Indonesia to research the country's economic and financial situation, and to produce recommendations. Schacht's report called for much increased foreign investment and expertise, directly contrasting with the Indonesian popular mood at the time. Sumitro did not implement these recommendations. He also took part in efforts to nationalize De Javasche Bank, the central bank of the Dutch East Indies era.

During this lull between his two ministerships, Sumitro also engaged in a public debate with Sjafruddin Prawiranegara on their differing views on Indonesian economic development. They were two of the highest-profile economists in Indonesia during the time, and hailed from different political parties. Both criticized the incumbent Sukiman Cabinet. Sumitro attacked Sjafruddin's priority on agrarian development, citing the poor standard of living in the agrarian economic structure before independence, and also disagreed with Sjafruddin's policy on accumulating capital reserves instead of pursuing an expansionary fiscal policy. The two agreed on maintaining foreign investment and capital in Indonesia, in contrast to several nationalist leaders at that time. Sumitro also supported the transmigration program moving residents from densely populated Java to other sparsely populated islands, though he noted that industrial development in the migration regions would be needed.

=== Minister of finance ===
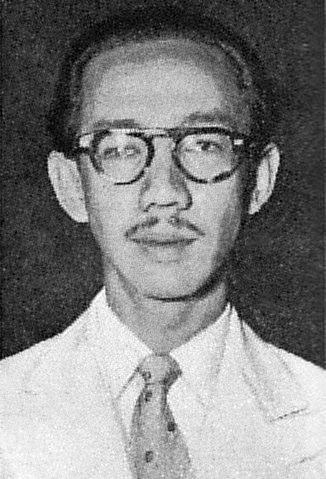
Sumitro as a Minister of Finance, 1954

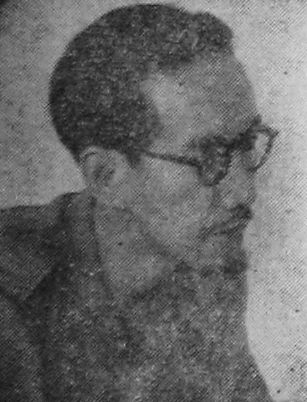
Sumitro c. 1952

In the Wilopo Cabinet sworn into office on 3 April 1952, Sumitro was given the office of Minister of Finance, replacing Jusuf Wibisono. When he first joined the finance ministry, which at that time still included many Dutch officials left from the colonial era, he noted how many of them were skilled administrators who were not qualified in economics. The nationalization of De Javasche Bank and its conversion into Bank Indonesia were completed during his tenure. When drafting the relevant laws, Sumitro incorporated a requirement that all directors of the Bank's board be Indonesian citizens. He also expanded the Benteng program, extending the list of restricted goods from ten per cent of imports to over half. Sumitro himself did not believe that the Benteng program would be perfect in execution, even commenting that a majority of the businessmen given support might turn out to be "parasites".

Following the collapse of the Wilopo Cabinet in 1953, political manoeuvring resulted in several cabinets failing to be approved. Sumitro was named Minister of Finance in one such proposed cabinet by Burhanuddin Harahap, but his candidacy in particular was vetoed by the Indonesian National Party and eventually the First Ali Sastroamidjojo Cabinet was formed on 30 July 1953 in which Sumitro was replaced by Ong Eng Die. In this period, Sumitro as part of the opposition criticized the Ali cabinet's policies, and claimed that the policies were an indirect attempt at forcing capital flight of Dutch firms. He would retake the office of finance minister from Ong Eng Die in 1955, as part of the Burhanuddin Harahap Cabinet. He was one of the few highly educated and experienced ministers in the cabinet. The country faced high inflation at that time, and it was decided to abolish the Benteng program. Though the program was intended to increase the participation of indigenous Indonesians, the government decided to prioritize increasing total domestic production to stabilize the economy.

Sumitro also implemented fiscal belt-tightening, reducing the government deficit significantly. These policies resulted in some reduction in inflation. In the aftermath of the 1955 election, where PSI performed poorly, Sumitro launched an unsuccessful challenge against Sjahrir's leadership of the party. (Note: Another account suggested that Sumitro had won the party vote, but the vote was annulled due to Sumitro's absence at the party congress.) Several PSI members considered Sumitro's organizational skills preferable to Sjahrir's ideological approach to the party. Sumitro was dispatched to Geneva in late 1955 to negotiate the issue of Western New Guinea with the Dutch, and despite progress on negotiations thanks to American, British, and Indian pressure on Dutch negotiators, domestic political pressure caused the Indonesian government to withdraw from negotiations in January 1956. The government ministers at Geneva at that time – Sumitro, health minister Johannes Leimena, and foreign minister Ide Anak Agung Gde Agung – were greatly disappointed by the development and considered resigning from government. In the final months of the cabinet, with its dissolution already scheduled, Sumitro extended government credits to several firms affiliated to politicians. This was seen by many as political patronage and resulted in increased pressure from the opposition to speed up the cabinet's dissolution.

Ali Sastroamidjojo explicitly excluded former ministers of the Harahap Cabinet, including Sumitro, from his second cabinet, with Jusuf Wibisono being reappointed as finance minister on 24 March 1955. Throughout the liberal democracy period, Sumitro had been described as the most powerful PSI government minister. In a 1952 paper Sumitro indicated the objectives of his policies – to stimulate domestic consumption and investment and improve Indonesia's trade balance – and commented that due to the poor administrative capabilities of the Indonesian government it should avoid direct interventions in the economy. Sumitro was also a supporter of foreign investment, and in a speech shortly before his first inauguration as finance minister he commented how removing foreign investors would be akin to "digging our own grave". To the few foreign companies which did invest in Indonesia during the 1950s (mostly oil companies) Sumitro offered fiscal incentives in exchange for their investment in the development of Indonesian human capital.

== Rebellion and exile ==
=== Joining the rebellion ===
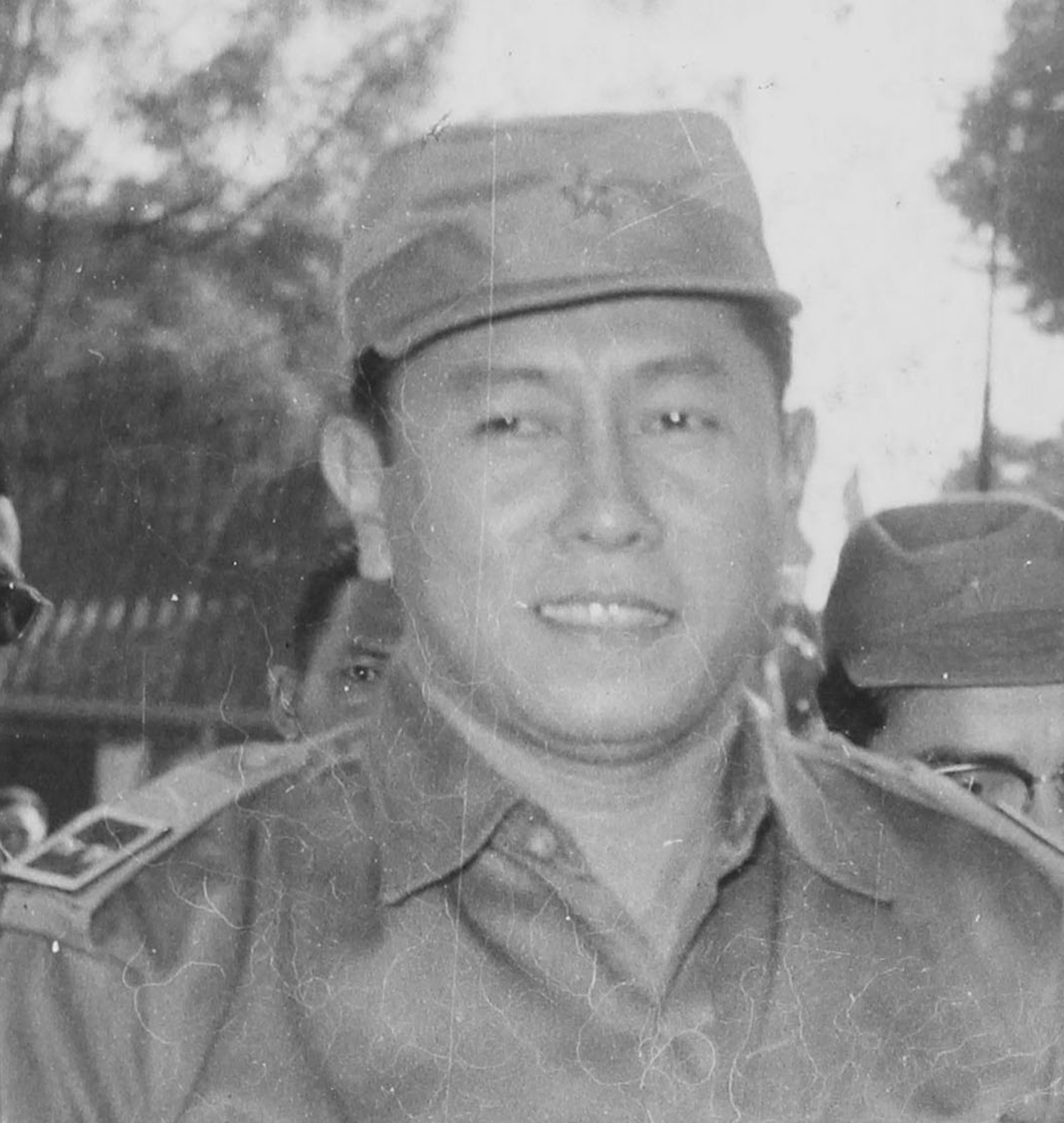
Ahmad Husein, leader of the Banteng Council in West Sumatra.

By the time of Djuanda Kartawidjaja's premiership in 1957, Sukarno had been showing his dislike for Western-educated economists such as Sumitro. This position was also supported by the Communist Party of Indonesia (PKI) under D. N. Aidit. Aidit directly accused Sumitro of "siding with imperialism and feudalism", and he argued that Sumitro's economic approach which involved foreign investment did not fit Indonesian rural society. Aidit rejected Sumitro's argument that poverty was caused by low investment and savings, and instead blamed capitalists, landlords, and foreign companies for engaging in rent-seeking behaviour. Communists, who already harboured resentment against PSI and Masyumi due to their participation in purging PKI members following the 1948 PKI coup d'état attempt, associated the general open approach to foreign investment with Sumitro. In early May 1957 Sumitro was summoned twice under suspicions of corruption related to PSI's fundraising for the 1955 election, and his links to a businessman who had been jailed for bribery. On 8 May 1957, he was given a third summons. To escape prosecution, Sumitro went into hiding at a friend's home in Tanah Abang before escaping to Sumatra with the help of Sjahrir. Arriving on 13 May in Central Sumatra, Sumitro found refuge under the Dewan Banteng (Banteng Council) in West Sumatra under the leadership of Lt Col Ahmad Husein. The council was formed by provincial military commanders such as Husein who were dissatisfied with Sukarno's increasing centralization of power, and had been demanding regional autonomy since its formation in late 1956. Following the resignation of Mohammad Hatta from the office of vice-president in December 1956, the movement received significant support from regional civilian leaders.

Throughout 1957 PSI politicians visited Sumitro, unsuccessfully attempting to convince him against joining the potential rebellion, and eventually Sumitro began to avoid the party's members sent for him altogether. As tensions continued to rise between the dissidents and the central government in Jakarta, many of the leaders of the Banteng Council including Sumitro refused to accept a potential compromise which would involve Hatta returning to the government. Other civilian leaders, such as Masyumi's Sjafruddin Prawiranegara and Burhanuddin Harahap later also escaped prosecution to West Sumatra and joined Sumitro and the Banteng Council. During this period, Sumitro travelled abroad frequently, making contacts with foreign governments and journalists, and in Singapore he re-established contact with a CIA agent he had previously met in Jakarta. In September Sumitro met with dissident colonels, and issued demands to the central government demanding decentralization, replacement of Abdul Haris Nasution as army chief, the reappointment of Hatta, and a ban on "internationally oriented communism". (Note: Nasution had long been viewed with disdain by regional military officers, especially after he attempted to centralize control of the Indonesian military by replacing several regional commanders. Conversely, Hatta had been seen as a representative of the regions outside Java, especially Sumatra, in the Indonesian government, and many viewed his resignation as a sign of increasing centralization.)

By October, Sumitro had begun corresponding with British and American intelligence agents, mainly in Singapore. It is likely that Sumitro's contacts with American agents increased the resolve of the dissident officers. Another meeting of the dissident colonels and politicians had been held in Padang in mid-September, and Sumitro communicated the results of the meeting to the Americans, painting the dissident group as an anti-communist front. Sumitro also stated his plans to finance the movement through the sales of Sumatra's agricultural products to the British. The Americans were generally supportive of the movement, being concerned with Sukarno's move towards "Guided Democracy" and the increasing influence of PKI in the Indonesian government, although American diplomats at the time still reassured Indonesian officials that the US did not wish to be "interfering in Indonesian internal affairs".

During his time in Padang, Sumitro opened the economics faculty of Andalas University, which had itself just opened in September 1956. Sumitro had been approached by a Minangkabau businessman to create the faculty in 1956, and had laid the initial groundwork prior to his flight from Jakarta. The faculty was officially opened in September 1957, with Sumitro becoming its dean and giving an opening lecture. He would give lectures for the faculty for some time before the rebellion broke out.

=== Defeat and exile ===
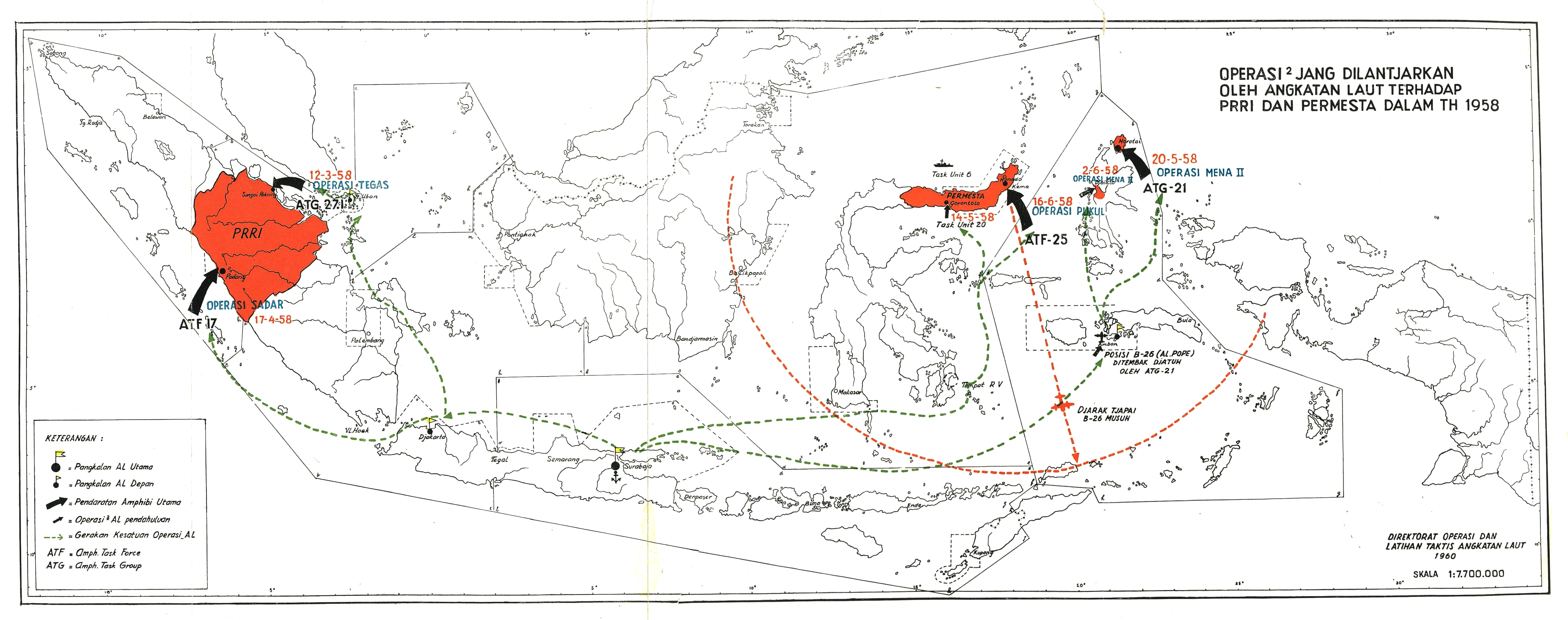
Military operations of the Indonesian Navy (black arrows) against Permesta and PRRI-controlled regions (orange), 1958

By late 1957 Sumitro was in contact with officials from the United States, Britain, British Malaya, the Philippines, and Thailand, as well as British, Dutch, and overseas Chinese businesses to raise funds for the rebellion. Both foreign aid and revenue from commodity smuggling allowed the rebels to purchase weapons and equipment, the United States covertly providing enough weapons for thousands of fighters. He participated in another dissident meeting in the town of Sungai Dareh in January 1958. The meeting was arranged by South Sumatra's military commander Colonel Barlian, who hoped to find a compromise between the dissidents and the Jakarta government. However, Sumitro along with the Banteng Council officers intended to push for an open armed confrontation with the central government. To moderate their pressure Barlian invited Masyumi leaders, hoping they would balance the bellicose officers. After the conference Barlian's refusal to accept any direct confrontation with the central government meant that no agreement was reached.

Despite the deadlock, Sumitro headed to Europe shortly after the meeting to raise more funds and give interviews relaying the movement's demands. When Sumitro was in Singapore in late January 1958, the Indonesian government sent a request to British authorities to repatriate him. As he continued to travel abroad, Sumitro's statements became increasingly bellicose, threatening a potential civil war in a 2 February statement from Geneva, then further claiming that should a civil war happen, Sukarno's government "would probably topple within ten days". Conversely, the pro-government press in Jakarta mocked Sumitro's (popularly believed) personal wealth, nicknaming him miljioener kerakjatan ("millionaire of the people", also a play on the PSI motto Kerakjatan). On 15 February 1958, the Revolutionary Government of the Republic of Indonesia (PRRI) was declared in Bukittinggi, in which Sumitro was named as minister of trade and communications, and Sjafruddin was appointed as prime minister. The following day, Sukarno ordered the arrest of PRRI's ministers, including Sumitro. Sumitro was considered one of the primary leaders of PRRI.

The PRRI performed poorly against the Indonesian military, being dislodged from the major cities of Sumatra by mid-1958. After Bukittinggi had been captured by the government, the rebels in Sumatra became isolated from the outside world. Because of this isolation, Sjafruddin permitted the Manado-based Permesta, a separate segment of the rebellion virtually autonomous from PRRI, to form a working cabinet. Sumitro was appointed as acting foreign minister in this cabinet. When the federal "United Republic of Indonesia" combining several rebel movements was announced by PRRI leaders in Sumatra in February 1960, Sumitro opposed the idea as he preferred a unitary state, and he did not want to work with the Darul Islam movement. Sumitro gradually drifted away from the Sumatra-based movement, and instead focused his efforts to support Permesta with smuggled supplies. As the movement was eventually defeated, Sumitro opted to remain abroad in exile, and in 1961 founded the Indonesian Renewal Movement (Gerakan Pembaruan Indonesia, GPI), an underground anti-Sukarno movement. GPI and Sumitro openly opposed Sukarno, in contrast to other Indonesian exiles at the time such as Sudjatmoko who adopted a policy of partial collaboration.

While abroad Sumitro worked as a consultant, mostly in Singapore. At times he went to Europe, on one occasion visiting Sjahrir during the latter's medical treatment in Switzerland. He also lived in Malaysia, and later in Bangkok. While in Malaysia he wrote a book on the economic history of the region to fund himself. He corresponded with anti-communist military officers during the Indonesia–Malaysia confrontation, and supported an attempt to revive the banned PSI although many of his former party colleagues viewed him negatively due to his participation in the rebellion. Sukarno had offered him a pardon, but as this would require him to recognize Sukarno's leadership, Sumitro refused. Because of Sumitro's involvement in the rebellion, many of his students who had pursued further education in foreign universities were excluded from government posts.

== New Order ==
=== Minister of trade ===
Following the fall of Sukarno and the ascent of Suharto as president in 1966, Suharto appointed Sumitro's former students such as Widjojo Nitisastro, Mohammad Sadli, Emil Salim and Subroto as advisers and ministers. Suharto's personal staffer Ali Murtopo was tasked with bringing Sumitro back to Indonesia, and after meeting him in Bangkok in March 1967, Sumitro was convinced to return. Aside from his economic expertise, according to Sumitro he was also invited back to facilitate a normalization of relations between Indonesia and Malaysia in the aftermath of the Indonesia–Malaysia confrontation. His arrival, in mid-1967, was kept secret for around three months, to hide Sumitro from Sukarno's remaining loyalists. He was appointed as Minister of Trade in the First Development Cabinet on 6 June 1968, replacing Mohammad Jusuf.

Shortly after his appointment Sumitro noted that repairing economic mismanagement during the Sukarno era would take "something like a generation". Sumitro adopted Keynesian policies to stimulate new development in certain sectors. He introduced restrictions on imports and created a "complementary foreign exchange" system to incentivize specific exports and discourage certain imports. To maximize exports, Sumitro established agencies in the coffee and copra industries to manage quality and export policies, while encouraging industrialization in the rubber industry by banning the exports of low-quality rubber and incentivizing investment in rubber processing factories. Sumitro also encouraged a shift in imports from consumer goods to capital goods, while stating his intention to increase duties to generate government revenue. He did not have full control over government economic policymaking, having to consult with other ministers and with Hamengkubuwono IX, the economic coordinating minister. This cabinet was the first to include the Berkeley Mafia, a group of Western-educated economists with Sumitro as a key member. Some other members such as Finance Minister Ali Wardhana were former students of Sumitro. Sumitro also was part of Suharto's economic advisory team in this period.

=== Minister of research ===
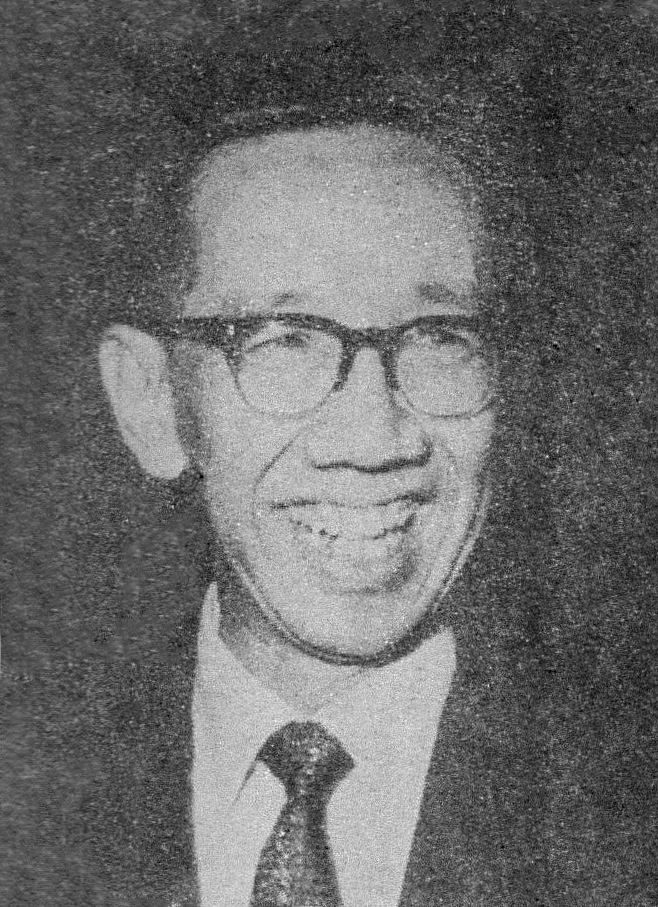
Sumitro in 1973, as Minister of Research

On 28 March 1973, Sumitro was reassigned as State Minister of Research in the Second Development Cabinet; Radius Prawiro replaced him as Minister of Trade. The ministry was previously headed by Suhadi Reksowardojo during the Sukarno period, although it had been inactive until Sumitro's appointment to the office. In part, this reassignment to a less powerful position was due to disagreements in economic views with Suharto. Late in 1973 he began discussions on Indonesian economic policy with students. Though he was quite successful with his own students at UI, students at the Bandung Institute of Technology were less accepting of his policies and Sumitro walked out from a discussion session with them. Several years later, university students were openly criticizing government development policies, having initially been silenced by crackdowns following the 1974 Malari incident. In August 1977 Sumitro and several other ministers began touring Indonesian universities in an attempt to explain the policies to the students, but the meetings instead resulted in students confronting him on government corruption and military involvement in politics. By the middle of the month, accepting that the tour had been a failure, Sumitro instead warned the students that any attempt to create a political movement would be dealt with "sternly".

Sumitro also created a national research program involving several economics faculties and research institutes in the country to help formulate government economic policies by gaining an insight into the country's long-term growth prospects. He did this as he was concerned that Suharto's five-year plans were not sufficiently taking into account long-term trends and visions. Despite the study's use in Indonesian economic planning, it was ceased when Sumitro was replaced by Bacharuddin Jusuf Habibie upon the expiry of the cabinet on 29 March 1978. Not long after his removal from office, Sumitro and Chairman of the National Audit Board Umar Wirahadikusumah published an estimate which stated that around one-third of the national budget was being lost due to either waste or corruption.

=== Private business ===
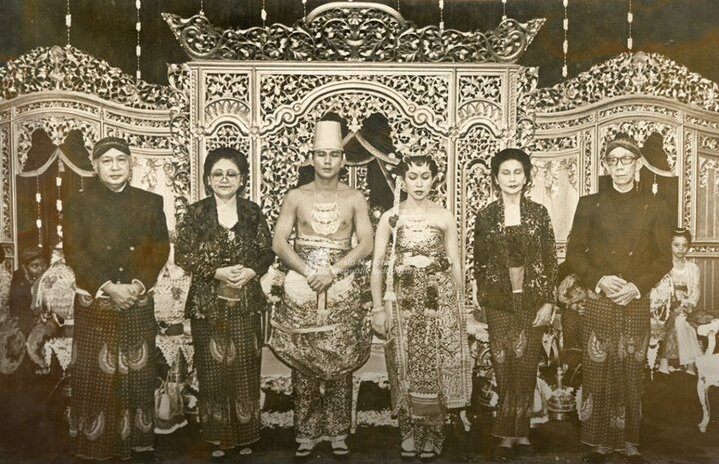
Sumitro (far right) and Suharto (far left) during their children's marriage, 1983.

Sumitro engaged in private business outside his government career, leveraging his political connections and foreign networks in Europe and the United States. He founded Indoconsult Associates, one of the first business consulting firms in the country, with Mochtar Lubis in July 1967. Sumitro was a founding member of the academic group East Asian Economic Association in 1984 and served as its first president. He was also significantly involved in the rise of the Astra conglomerate, when in 1968 he helped the company gain a sole distributorship of Toyota vehicles in the country. The company's founder, William Suryajaya, had developed relations with Sumitro since the 1950s. Sumitro was appointed president commissioner of Astra in 1992, when the debt-laden group faced a takeover attempt by a consortium of external conglomerates. Suryajaya initially tasked Sumitro with preventing the takeover, but Suryajaya eventually decided to sell his shares without first consulting Sumitro. Sumitro resigned in December 1992 and the takeover was completed by January 1993.

Although no longer a government minister, Sumitro still held considerable influence in policymaking circles since many of his former pupils held government positions during the 1980s, and because of his continued teaching at UI. By the early 1980s, the Indonesian state-owned enterprises' role in the economy had been scaled down in favour of increased private sector participation to the extent that Sumitro had advised. Sumitro then began to develop concerns on the structure of the Indonesian economy under Suharto as time went on. Though industrialization did progress rapidly, Sumitro was concerned with the presence of "special interests" that held ownership in many industries and the excessive protectionist policies of the government. Despite his previous Keynesian policies of extensive state involvement, he subsequently viewed the Indonesian economy as overregulated and in need of deregulation. He considered Indonesia's industry to be fundamentally fragile and apparently productive only at the surface level. By the 1990s, he became more a critic of "rent-seeking activities", and ridiculed outright the Timor "national car" project in 1996. When the Asian financial crisis struck Indonesia late in the decade, Sumitro blamed institutional problems and corruption for the impact and called for "immediate and firm action". Though his influence in government policymaking was diminished, he continued to play a role in politics, supporting the unsuccessful attempt to nominate Emil Salim as vice-president in early 1998.

== Views ==
According to Sumitro, as a student, his views were strongly influenced by Joseph Schumpeter, Frank Knight, Eugen von Böhm-Bawerk, and Irving Fisher. He was also influenced by the Fabian Society, in addition to the works of French novelist André Malraux. He saw the previous colonial economy as creating two separate systems: one of subsistence economics and another of commercial, and subscribed to the theories of W. Arthur Lewis that low productivity generated from subsistence economics can be improved through the encouragement of industrialization. To accomplish this, Sumitro wrote in support of foreign investments, with caveats on domestic capital and labour participation, human development, and reinvestment of profits within Indonesia. Though he disliked the enforcement of quotas and restrictions on trade, he acknowledged that it was politically impossible for Indonesia during his time to engage in a complete free-market economic regime. Many of his policies were based on an intention to remove Dutch influence from the Indonesian economy, and his opposition to Sjafruddin Prawiranegara's policies was because he believed they simply continued the Dutch approach.

Due to Sumitro's preference for a technocracy and industrialization, he viewed the Western Bloc more favourably in the Cold War, and he was an ardent anti-communist. While he was a PSI member, he did not subscribe to social democratic views held by the party's ideologues. He also endorsed the development of cooperatives to develop the Indonesian rural economy. In regards to government fiscal policy, Sumitro wrote in support of a balanced budget primarily as a means of disciplining government expenditures, but was opposed to cuts in development spending. During the early Sukarno period, Sumitro also viewed income redistribution in developing countries such as Indonesia as more achievable through strong trade unions instead of through redistributive taxation.

== Personal life ==
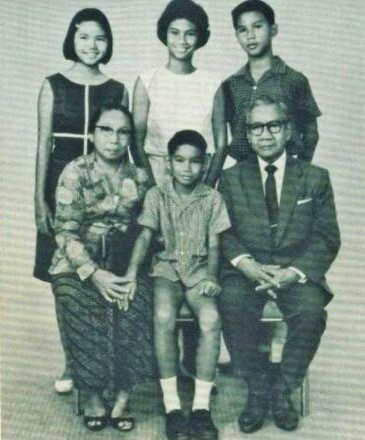
Sumitro's parents with Sumitro's four children in 1963

Two of Sumitro's brothers, Subianto and Subandio, were active in the Indonesian youth movement and were both killed during the Lengkong incident of 1946. He married Dora Marie Sigar, whom he had met during his time in the Netherlands, on 7 January 1945. They were of different ethnicities and religions – for Dora was a Manadonese Christian and Sumitro was a Javanese Muslim. The couple had four children, including the 8th and current President of Indonesia, Prabowo Subianto and businessman Hashim Djojohadikusumo. Out of his four children, two were Muslims (but one has since become a born-again Protestant Christian) and two were Christians (who both converted to Roman Catholicism after marriage to their respective husbands, a Javanese Catholic as well as a Frenchman, as they were both born and raised Protestants). His family had followed Sumitro into exile following PRRI's defeat.

Sumitro's family has often been described as a political dynasty, their involvement in politics originating from his father Margono and extending four generations to post-Suharto legislators such as Rahayu Saraswati and Aryo Djojohadikusumo (both Hashim's children). Prabowo also married Titiek Suharto, one of Suharto's daughters, although they divorced after fifteen years. Following Prabowo's removal from the military due to his involvement in the activist kidnappings in the late 1990s, Sumitro wrote in defence of his son, and accused either Wiranto (Prabowo's superior officer) or B. J. Habibie (vice-president at the time) of pinning the blame on Prabowo. Sumitro's sister, Sukartini Djojohadikusumo, became an Indonesian centenarian in 2019.

Sumitro was an avid tennis player and a heavy smoker. He had written 130 books and articles mostly on economic matters between 1942 and 1994, and published his autobiography in 2000. He died just past midnight on 9 March 2001 at the Dharma Nugraha Hospital in Rawamangun, East Jakarta due to heart failure. He had been suffering from a heart disease and atherosclerosis for some time. He was buried in Karet Bivak Cemetery.

== Legacy ==
In a 1986 interview Sumitro commented on his multiple rises and falls in politics, saying that he "never won a political battle but [...] learnt how to survive defeats". His critics describe him as a political opportunist, due to his distancing from former Socialist Party members during the Suharto period and his son Prabowo's marriage to Titiek. In a 1999 interview with Tempo, he rejected the label, preferring to be called a "pragmatist". In the same interview, although he acknowledged his contacts with the CIA, he denied his characterization by American historian George McTurnan Kahin as a CIA asset. Indonesian academic Vedi R. Hadiz noted that although Sumitro's economic thought could not be described as "liberal", he strongly opposed Sukarno's anti-capitalist stance. On Sumitro's involvement in PRRI, Hadiz wrote that "he did so in the name of capitalism".

Sumitro's role in Indonesia's early formation and his economic policies have prominently featured in the electoral campaigns of his son's political party, Gerindra. A road and a building within the UI complex is named after him. The United States – Indonesia Society named one of its academic grant programs, the Sumitro Fellows Program, after him. He has been described by several authors as a highly influential economist in both the Sukarno and Suharto periods, and often as the most influential altogether. In his obituary The Jakarta Post described Sumitro as "the father of modern Indonesian economics", many of his writings being incorporated into standard textbooks on economics in Indonesia.

Sumitro's son Hashim cited Sumitro's economic policies as the inspiration for the economic policies of Prabowo Subianto as president. During Prabowo's presidency, a movement emerged to have Sumitro declared a National Hero of Indonesia, initiated at his hometown in Kebumen and receiving an endorsement from Kebumen's regent, Lilis Nuryati. In 2025, a bust of Sumitro was unveiled across the Kebumen railway station. His grave at Karet Bivak also sees a number of pilgrims.

== Notes ==
Political offices
Preceded by Suhadi Reksowardojo (1966) as Minister of National Research Institute	State Minister for Research; 1973–1978	Succeeded by B. J. Habibie
Preceded by Mohammad Jusuf	Minister of Trade; 1968–1973	Succeeded by Radius Prawiro
Preceded by Tandiono Manu	Minister of Trade and Industry; 1950–1951	Succeeded by Sujono Hadinoto
Preceded by Ong Eng Die	Minister of Finance; 1955–1956	Succeeded by Jusuf Wibisono
Preceded by Jusuf Wibisono	Minister of Finance; 1952–1953	Succeeded by Ong Eng Die
