= Natsir Cabinet =

Cabinet of Indonesia (1950–1951)

Natsir Cabinet Kabinet Natsir
- Cabinet of Indonesia
- 6 September 1950 – 27 April 1951
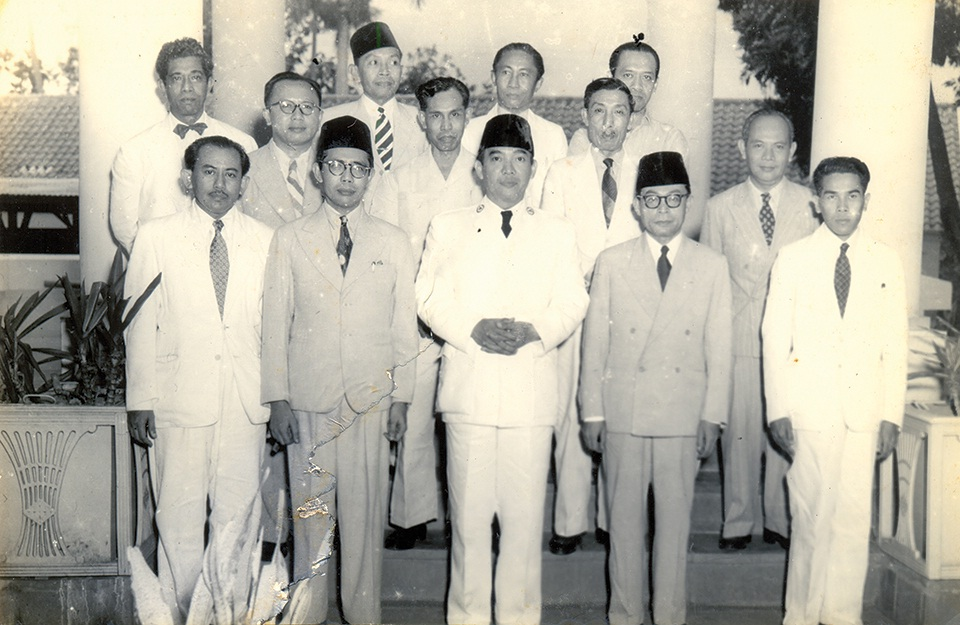
- Members of the cabinet with President Sukarno
- Date formed: 6 September 1950
- Date dissolved: 27 April 1951

People and organisations
- President: Sukarno
- Prime Minister: Mohammad Natsir
- Member parties: Masyumi; PSI; PIR; Democratic; Parindra; Catholic; Parkindo; PSII

History
- Predecessor: RIS; Halim
- Successor: Soekiman

The Natsir Cabinet (Indonesian: Kabinet Natsir) was the cabinet of Indonesia from September 1950 to April 1951. It was led by Mohammad Natsir as prime minister. It was the first cabinet formed after the dissolution of the United States of Indonesia and the return of a unitary state.

Mohammad Natsir was sworn officially on 7 September 1950 at Yogyakarta Palace by President Sukarno as The First Prime Ministry of Indonesia. During this cabinet period, there were rebellions throughout Indonesia and domestic security issues, such as the DI / TII Movement, the Andi Azis Movement, the APRA Movement, and the RMS Movement. Negotiations on the West Irian issue have also been initiated but met a dead end. On 22 January 1951, the parliament delivered a vote of no confidence and won, which resulted in Prime Minister Natsir to return his mandate to the President on 21 March 1951. Another cause was the acceptance of Hadikusumo, which proposed the dissolution of all DPRDs that had been formed. According to the government, the motion was not possible because of formal legal reasons.

== Members ==
Portfolio	Holder	Party
Prime Ministry	Mohammad Natsir	Masyumi
Deputy Head Ministry	Hamengkubuwana IX	-
Ministry of Foreign Affairs	Mohammad Roem	Masyumi
Ministry of Home Affairs	Assaat	-
Ministry of Defence	Dr. Abdul Halim	-
Ministry of Justice	Wongsonegoro	PIR
Ministry of Information	M. A. Pellaupessy	Democratic Faction
Ministry of Finance	Sjafruddin Prawiranegara	Masyumi
Ministry of Agriculture	Tandiono Manu	PSI
Ministry of Trade and Industry	Sumitro Djojohadikusumo	PSI
Ministry of Transportation	Djuanda	-
Ministry of Public Work and Labour	Herman Johannes	Great Indonesian Party
Ministry of Labor	R. P. Suroso	Great Indonesian Party
Ministry of Social Service	Harjadi	Catholic Party
Ministry of Education and Culture	Bahder Johan	-
Ministry of Health	Dr. Johannes Leimena	Catholic Party
Ministry of Religious Affairs	K. H. A. Wahid Hasyim	Masyumi
Ministry of State	Harsono Tjokroaminoto	PSII

== History ==
=== Cabinet formation ===
On 20 August 1949, President Sukarno exercised his prerogative by appointing Mohammad Natsir to become a cabinet formation. The Natsir's Cabinet was a coalition cabinet with Masyumi Party's as it core. However, the PNI did not get a position in this cabinet, most of the member of this party consists of Masyumi Party people, although there were non-party members in the cabinet. This cabinet was where well-known professional figures sit in it, such as Sri Sultan Hamengkubuwana IX, Ir. Djuanda and Prof. Dr. Sumitro Djojohadikusumo. It is why the cabinet got the epithet 'Zaken Cabinet'. Natsir motive was to lead a nationalistic cabinet with coalition parties as the members. However, this cannot be fulfilled because there was a fight for seat formation in the cabinet between PNI and Masyumi Party, causing displeasure from PNI's side and difficulty in pursuing PNI to join his cabinet. In this case, Natsir reasoned that his party had more rights than any other party, yet on the other hand, the PNI did not agree with this because, for them, all parties were entitled to a position in the cabinet. PNI demanded that people from their party got the position as Ministry of Home Affairs, Ministry of Foreign Affairs, and Ministry of Education. After negotiating, PNI were willing to give up the position of Ministry of Foreign Affairs to Masyumi and Ministry of Education for another party with the promise of taking the position as Ministry of Home Affairs. Yet, the hope of getting that position had to crumble after it was decided that Masyumi must take the position. PNI conceded this unfair considering the position of Prime Minister itself already filled with Masyumi.

Besides being criticised by other parties, Natsir Cabinet also got criticised by its own core party, Masyumi. The criticism was aimed at December 1949 congressional decision that banned a party's general chairman from becoming a minister. The purpose of this congress was party consolidation but it was changed by the Party Council in Bogor at 3–6 June 1950 that profess the federal system could no longer be maintained. In order to not violated the congress decision too much, Natsir was deactivated from his position as the general chairman of Masyumi Party and was replaced by Jusuf Wibisono.

=== First appointment ===
After being ratified and installed on 6 September 1950, the Natsir Cabinet was only able to work effectively after gaining the trust and approval of its work program from parliament in its session on 25 October 1950, namely 118 votes in favour and 73 votes against.

== Cabinet programs ==
1. Prepare and hold elections for the Constituent Assembly in a short time.
2. Achieve consolidation and perfect government structure.
3. To intensify efforts to achieve security and peace.
4. Develop and strengthen the strength of a healthy national economy.
5. Help the development of public housing and expand business ventures to raise people's health and intelligence.
6. Improve the organization of the Armed Forces and the recovery of former ex-Army and Guerilla Members into the community.
7. Fight for the settlement of the problem of West Irian.

== Implementation of cabinet programs ==
Despite having the trust and support of the Indonesian Parliament (DPR), the Natsir Cabinet was unable to carry out its program properly. Parliament, chaired by Sartono from the PNI at the time, acted more as an opponent than as a government partner in planning and implementing cabinet programs.

=== Election issues ===
One of the main programs of the Natsir Cabinet was to hold general elections to form a Constituent Assembly that would be tasked with drafting and enacting the Republic of Indonesia Constitution which remained in accordance with the mandate of Article 134 of the 1950 United States Constitution. To carry out the election, there needs to be guidelines regulated by law. Therefore, the Natsir Cabinet through the Minister of Justice Mr Wongsonegoro has drafted an election bill.

When Natsir's Cabinet through the Minister of Justice submitted the electoral bill to the Indonesian parliament in February 1951 to be discussed and passed into law so that it could be used as a guideline for conducting elections, the parliament led by PNI people who became the government's opposition, did not immediately discuss it. By not discussing the electoral bill by the parliament, the draft law is neglected and cannot be passed into an election law. That also resulted in the election could not be held, because there is no law governing its implementation.

=== Domestic security issues ===
==== Armed guerrillas ====
When the Natsir Cabinet took over the responsibility of the Indonesian government, domestic security problems had not yet fully recovered. Many armed groups are scattered throughout Indonesia. They possessed weapons legally because they seized them from the Japanese and Dutch colonial forces who were then used to fight to defend Indonesian independence. There are followers of S. M. Kartosuwiryo who called himself DI / TII in West Java, there was a communist group called "Merapi-Merbabu Complex" (MMC) In Central Java, there were Kahar Muzakar followers in South Sulawesi and "Laskar Hari Liar" in North Sumatra. As long as the weapons still available to them have not been put in order, the domestic security is not guaranteed.

==== Republic of South Maluku (RMS) ====
Republic of South Maluku Logo

Another problem in regard to internal security is the group that clearly states that it is independent and independent of Indonesian power, namely the RMS. Soumokil who proclaimed the Republic of South Maluku (RMS) in Ambon on 25 April 1950, namely the RIS Cabinet (Mohammad Hatta). The RIS government has tried to persuade the RMS by sending Dr. Johannes Leimena, a republican from Ambon to negotiate, but failed. On 14 July 1950, RIS sent TNI troops led by Lieutenant Colonel Slamet Riyadi to quell him. The RMS is supported by former KNIL (Dutch era soldiers) who are sufficiently trained and able to survive.

When the RIS Cabinet was replaced by the Natsir Cabinet, the RMS Rebellion had not yet been resolved. On 11 November 1950, TNI troops succeeded in occupying Fort Veronica which was the basis of the RMS defence and could subsequently take full control of Ambon City.

=== Aceh predicament ===
The big problem that must be resolved by Natsir while serving as Prime Minister was the demand for full autonomy for the Aceh region. This problem also needs special handling and caution. The initial problem was that there was a change in government from the union to unity. The Aceh region was made part of the North Sumatra Province, whereas previously since December 1949 Aceh had become a separate province with the status of a Special Region, namely during the Hatta II Cabinet. The reintegration of the Aceh region into North Sumatra Province caused great and deep disappointment from the people of Aceh. They did not accept the merger decision and demanded rehabilitation of the Aceh province.

Prime Minister Natsir sent the Minister of Home Affairs, Mr Assaat and Minister of Finance, Mr Sjafruddin Prawiranegara to Aceh to negotiate the settlement of this matter. However, no agreement was reached. Subsequently, on 27 November 1950, the Vice President, Mohammad Hatta, came to Aceh to convey his views on regional autonomy in the DPRD building, but his speech was strongly opposed so he had to return to Jakarta the next day because he did not get results.

The demands of the people of Aceh are increasing. On 22 December 1950, based on the decision of the meeting of the Association of All Aceh Ulemas (PUSA), Prime Minister Natsir received a telegram from the Aceh Military Governor which threatened that the Governor and all office messengers would resign their positions if by 1 January 1951 Aceh was not made a province. Natsir answered the telegram by stating that he had to wait until he came to Aceh. However, Natsir could not immediately come to Aceh because his second child, who was 13 years old, Abu Hanifah, had an accident while playing in the Manggarai Swimming Pool until he died.

On 23 January 1951, Natsir and his entourage left for Aceh. In the evening there was a formal meeting attended by 80 local government officials and Aceh community leaders. Tengku Muhammad Daud Beureu'eh (Aceh Military Governor and PUSA figure), as the leader of the meeting, he reiterated the wishes and demands of the people of Aceh to gain full autonomy.

In his speech, Natsir explained that the central government had no objection to fulfilling Aceh's wishes, only that for implementation it needed a law that needed to be prepared, then submitted it to parliament to be ratified.

=== Educational queries ===
Natsir's idea of national integration is not limited to the state structure but also in other fields, one of which is education. Natsir saw that one of the big problems in the education system at that time was the dualism between religious education and the general education system. Structurally, the systems are respectively under the Ministry of Religion and the Ministry of Education and Culture. Natsir tried to eradicate the dualism, but not with a structural approach such as the merging of two parties, but with an approach from the point of education itself. The Natsir Cabinet appeared as a driver of the convergence process of general education and religious education in Indonesia. Through the two ministers, the Natsir Cabinet put the idea that religious education must be supplemented by religious education and religious education must be supplemented by general science lessons.

=== Economic problems ===
One program that is considered good by the Natsir Cabinet is in the fields of economics and development. Supporting, among others, were two prominent Indonesian economists at the time, namely Sjafruddin Prawiranegara as Minister of Finance and Soemitro Djojohadikusumo as Minister of Trade and Industry. The Natsir Cabinet saw that a newly completed Indonesia from the war to defend independence was not easy to carry out development and development could not be carried out with the spirit of romanticism of a mere national awakening. For this reason, an in-depth study of all aspects, both weaknesses and strengths, is needed so that development can produce results.

Natsir's Cabinet assigned to a research company from the United States, J.C. White Engineering Corp to conduct a feasibility study for the formation of the National Design Bureau (BPN). The company was also asked to examine the potential of economic potential contained in Indonesia. However, because the Natsir Cabinet was short-lived, the research could not be completed but was continued by other cabinet ministers. Later, the BPN that was designed by the Natsir Cabinet developed into the National Development Planning Agency (Bappenas) which was very instrumental in the development of Indonesia, especially during the New Order.

=== West Irian problem ===
The Natsir Cabinet sent a delegation led by the Minister of Foreign Affairs, Mohammad Roem to a conference on West Irian which was held in The Hague on 4 December 1950. But the conference failed because the Dutch refused to return sovereignty over West Irian to Indonesia. The deadlocked negotiations resumed on 13–16 December 1950, after each delegation consulted with the government. The Indonesian delegation proposed three formulations, namely:

1. The transfer of sovereignty of West Irian was carried out to Indonesia.

2. Submission at a certain time, namely in mid-1951

3. Before the surrender was made, a conference was first held in order to preserve various Dutch interests in West Irian.

The three formulations were rejected by the Dutch so that the negotiations failed again. Noting that there was no intention of the Dutch to surrender sovereignty of West Irian to Indonesia, Prime Minister Natsir stated before the Indonesian parliament that the status of the Dutch-Indonesian Union needed a review. Efforts that were continually initiated by the Natsir Cabinet were continued by other cabinet ministers but suffered the same fate from the Dutch who wished to continue to control the West Irian region.

== Achievements ==
=== Sumitro Plan ===
The Sumitro Plan is an economic and industrial development program. The target of this program is to concentrate on the development of basic industries, such as cement factories, printing companies, sack factories, and spinning mills.

==== Success of Sumitro Plan ====
1. Successfully reorganized Bank Indonesia to become the First Foreign Exchange Bank.
2. Carry out a reorganization of Bank Rakyat Indonesia so that it can help new activities in the field of trade and domestic production.
3. To establish a new bank, the State Industrial Bank to finance long-term development. Now, this bank is called Bank Pembangunan Indonesia (Bapindo).
4. Can lay instructions for establishing new companies in advancing small industries in agricultural areas such as leather processing, making umbrellas, bricks, tiles and ceramic.
5. Successfully built medium and large industries, such as printing, remailing gum, paper mills, and fertilizer factories.

=== Accession to the UN ===
Indonesia was accepted as the 60th member of the United Nations on 28 September 1950.

== Problems ==
1. Efforts to fight for the West Irian Problem with the Netherlands failed.
2. In implementing Sumitro Plan, national entrepreneurs were given credit assistance but were misused, causing the cabinet to fail in achieving their targets.
3. The emergence of the problem of domestic security, namely there were rebellions in almost all regions of Indonesia. For example: Andi Aziz Movement, DI/TII Movement, APRA Movement, and RMS Movement.
4. Too often issuing emergency laws which got negative responds from the opposition party.

== Fallout ==
1. PNI did not approve the enactment of government regulation number 39 year 1950 concerning DPRD that considered beneficial to Masyumi only.
2. Hadikusumo's motion from PNI regarding the freezing and dissolution of DPRD.

== See also ==
- Sukiman-Suwirjo Cabinet
- Wilopo Cabinet
- Ali Sastroadmijojo I Cabinet
- Burhanuddin Harahap Cabinet
- Ali Sastroamidjojo II Cabinet
- Djuanda Cabinet
