= Jusuf Wibisono =

Indonesian politician and economist (1909–1982)

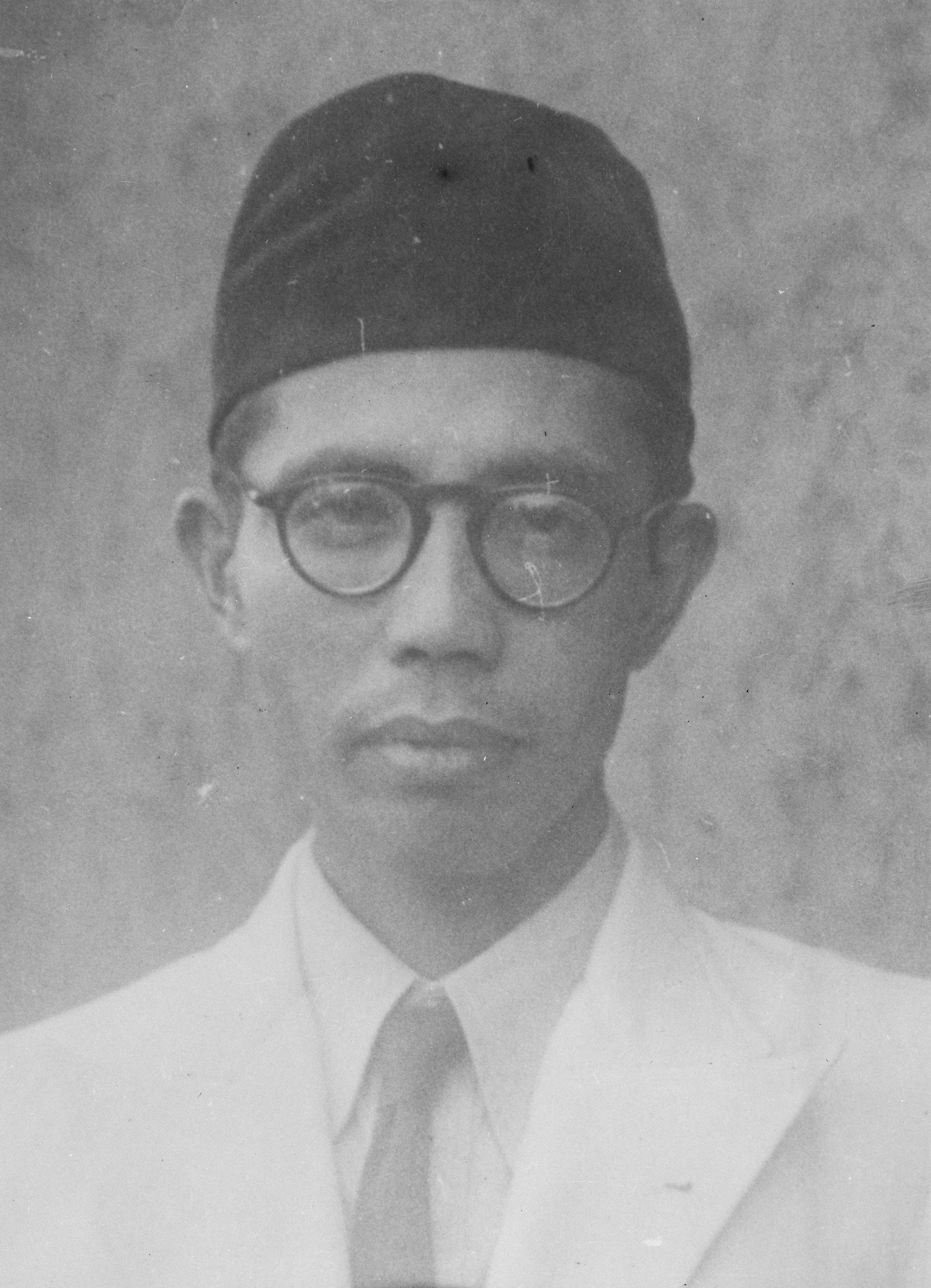
- Portrait, 1947

Minister of Finance
- In office 24 March 1956 – 9 January 1957
- Prime Minister: Ali Sastroamidjojo
- Preceded by: Sumitro Djojohadikusumo
- Succeeded by: Sutikno Slamet
- In office 27 April 1951 – 3 April 1952
- Prime Minister: Soekiman Wirjosandjojo
- Preceded by: Sjafruddin Prawiranegara
- Succeeded by: Sumitro Djojohadikusumo

Deputy Minister of Prosperity
- In office 2 October 1946 – 27 June 1947
- Minister: Adnan Kapau Gani
- Preceded by: Office established

Personal details
- Born: 28 February 1909 Magelang, Kedu Residency, Dutch East Indies (present-day Central Java, Indonesia)
- Died: 15 June 1982 (aged 73) Jakarta, Indonesia
- Party: Masyumi (1940s–1960); PSII (1960/1970–1973)
- Education: Rechtshogeschool (Mr.)
- Occupation: Politician; economist

Jusuf Wibisono (EVO: Joesoef Wibisono; 28 February 1909 – 15 June 1982) was an Indonesian politician and economist. A member of the Masyumi Party, he served as Minister of Finance from 1951 to 1952 and again from 1956 to 1957, under the Soekiman and Second Ali Sastroamidjojo cabinets. Born in Magelang, Wibisono took part in Islamic organizations in the nationalist movement from his school years. He joined Masyumi during the Indonesian National Revolution, and became a leading member within the party despite disagreements with other party leaders such as Mohammad Natsir. In both of his tenures as finance minister, Wibisono relaxed the tight budgetary controls of his predecessor, and provided favors to political parties.

An ardent opponent of the Communist Party of Indonesia, Wibisono attempted to organize the Masyumi to work with President Sukarno during the late 1950s to oppose the communists. Instead, he was sidelined in the party before being arrested by the government in crackdowns due to Masyumi involvement in the PRRI rebellion. Following the fall of Sukarno, he and former Prime Minister Soekiman Wirjosandjojo considered establishing their own political party, though they decided against it. Instead, Wibisono joined the ranks of the Indonesian Islamic Union Party (PSII), but the PSII's poor performance in the 1971 legislative election led to his retirement from politics. He died in 1982 at Dr. Cipto Mangunkusumo Hospital.

== Early life and career ==
Jusuf Wibisono was born on 28 February 1909 in Magelang, today in Central Java, as the third child of four children. After completing his education at a Hollandsch-Inlandsche School (HIS), he continued to a Meer Uitgebreid Lager Onderwijs (MULO), although his father, Kunto Wibisono, had wanted him to study to be a teacher. Afterwards, he briefly studied at the STOVIA medical school before dropping out due to being unfit. Instead, he continued his education at a Algemene Middelbare School (AMS) in Bandung. Wibisono continued to the Rechtshogeschool in Batavia, graduating with a Meester in de Rechten in 1941, shortly before the Japanese invasion of the Dutch East Indies. During his studies, Wibisono became active in the Jong Islamieten Bond youth organization, and in 1934 along with Mohammad Roem he co-founded a branch that catered to secondary students, the Studenten Islam Studieclub. He had begun to work at the colonial government before completing his law degree, first at the economic department and then in the central statistics office. He became a commercial judge during the Japanese occupation of the Dutch East Indies. Following the proclamation of Indonesian independence, Wibisono was appointed into the Central Indonesian National Committee (KNIP), and became a member of the KNIP's working body. He was later appointed Junior Minister of Prosperity in the Third Sjahrir Cabinet.

== Political career ==
=== Minister of Finance ===
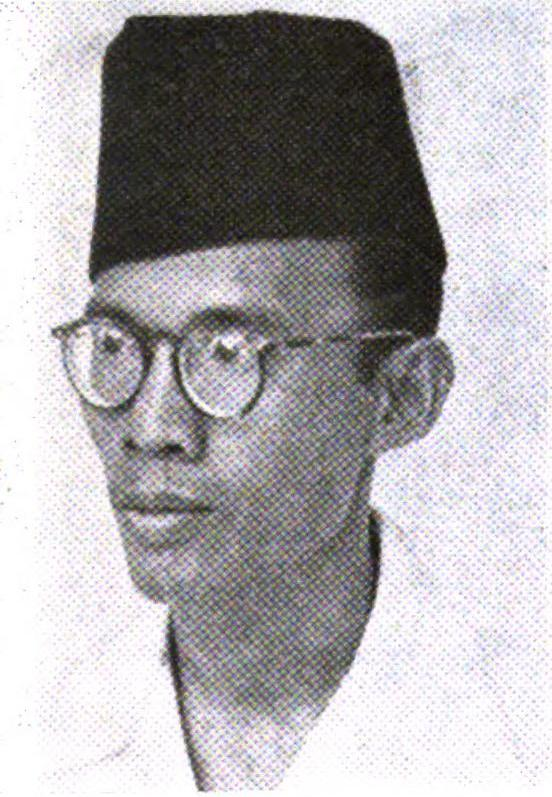
Official portrait, c. 1954

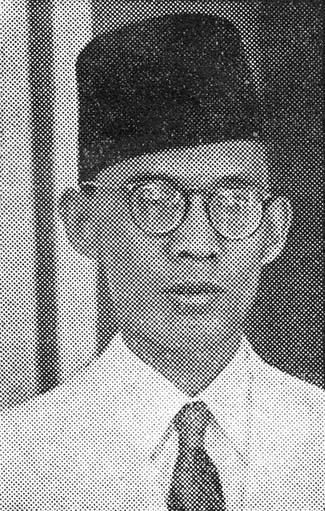
Photograph of Wibisono, c. 1954

After the conclusion of the Indonesian National Revolution, Wibisono joined the Provisional People's Representative Council as a member of the Masyumi Party. He was a critic of the Natsir Cabinet, despite Mohammad Natsir being in the same party. Wibisono instead was affiliated more closely to Soekiman Wirjosandjojo. In March 1951, he even publicly urged the resignation of the Natsir cabinet, citing the failure to arrange a conference on Western New Guinea. He was then appointed as minister of finance in Soekiman's cabinet, announced on 26 April 1951. In his first press conference after being sworn in, Wibisono announced the nationalization of De Javasche Bank, the colonial central bank. The nationalization process under Wibisono was voluntary – that is, shares were purchased at above market price – and Wibisono noted that he would not be immediately replacing foreign staff with Indonesian ones. By October 1951, the government had taken over 97 percent of the company's shares, and by December the bank was officially nationalized. He later served in the bank's council of advisors in-between his ministerial tenures.

Wibisono was noted for his relatively lax approach to finances compared to his predecessor Sjafruddin Prawiranegara. During his first tenure, which saw strong government finances from increased exports, he arranged for government-owned banks to loan money to politically affiliated firms, bonuses to civil servants, and less strictly controlled government budgets in general. He was replaced by Sumitro Djojohadikusumo in the succeeding Wilopo Cabinet. Between his first and second tenures, Wibisono worked at a Dutch car importer. He also accepted a job as a chairman of a Japanese bank, under the condition that his name not be listed on the bank's board register. He had engagements with Chinese Indonesian businesses. In 1953, he was appointed chairman of the Union of Muslim Workers of Indonesia (SBII), the labor organization wing of Masyumi. He served at this post until 1966. He made public statements calling for the increase of the work day (from seven hours to eight), and was briefly examined by prosecutors after criticizing members of the First Ali Sastroamidjojo Cabinet.

He made speeches denouncing communism and the Soviet Union, and led a Masyumi opposition to establishment of diplomatic relations in 1953–1954. In November 1954, he tabled a motion of no confidence against the Ali Cabinet, in particular attacking the policies of Economic Minister Iskaq Tjokroadisurjo, perceived to be favoring the Indonesian National Party (PNI). Iskaq proceeded to resign, and the motion of no confidence was defeated. He returned to his post as finance minister in the Second Ali Sastroamidjojo Cabinet. Disbursements to politically affiliated businesses continued, and in one case in July 1956, Wibisono provided favors for a Nahdlatul Ulama-affiliated business to ensure Sjafruddin Prawiranegara's reappointment as governor of Bank Indonesia. He also announced a reduction of 30 percent in the government headcount, to be implemented in stages, and the program was not executed during his tenure. He resigned on 9 January 1957 and was replaced with Djuanda Kartawidjaja. After the end of his ministerial tenure, he was arrested under corruption charges in April 1957, although he was released by March 1958 – officially for a lack of evidence.

=== Masyumi dissolution ===
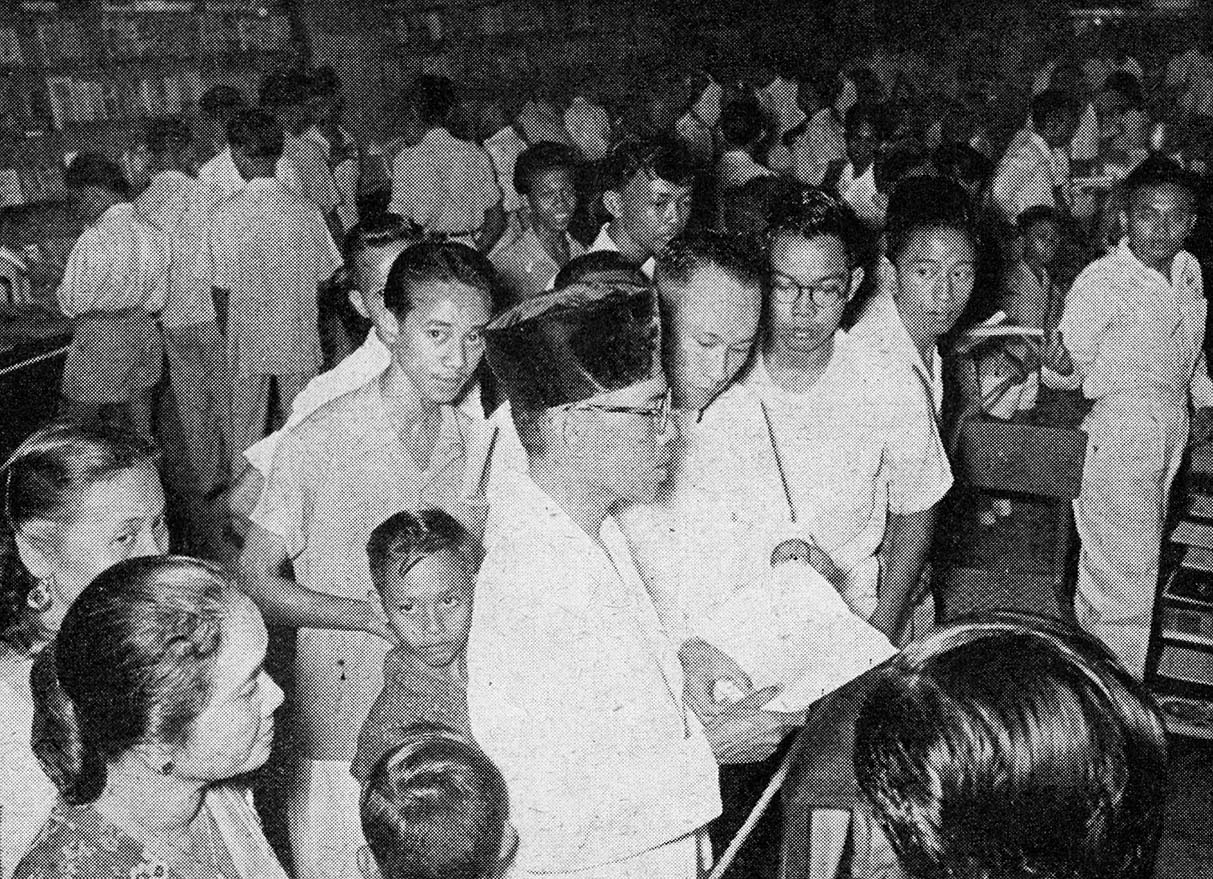
Wibisono looking at political books, c. 1954

Shortly before his release, in early 1958, Masyumi leaders including Natsir, Sjafruddin, and Burhanuddin Harahap became involved in the Revolutionary Government of the Republic of Indonesia, a shadow government contesting the Jakarta government. Wibisono himself was not involved, and once released wanted to condemn the actions of Natsir and others, but after discussions the party and its members elected to not issue any support or denouncements. In the ensuing political shifts, the Indonesian Communist Party gained significant powers and Wibisono wanted Masyumi to work with the PNI and Christian parties in order to prevent the Communists from entering government. Wibisono was willing to give significant concessions such as increasing President Sukarno's power to do this, but he was sidelined and instead the party under the new leadership of Prawoto Mangkusasmito opted to form a united front with other Islamic parties.

Masyumi was eventually dissolved in 1960, and Wibisono joined the People's Representative Council of Mutual Assistance (DPR-GR) in 1960 under the umbrella of SBII, which had by then separated from Masyumi. He cut ties with nearly all Masyumi leaders except Soekiman, but Wibisono was still arrested in late 1963 or early 1964 under conspiracy charges and was imprisoned for nearly three years without trial. In mid-1966, Wibisono and other former Masyumi leaders were released from prison following the fall of Sukarno. Alongside Soekiman, Wibisono considered establishing their own political party which would be founded on Islam but which "mustn't be too religious". (Note: Original: "Tidak terlalu agamis".) However, both men decided against it after consulting with figures from the new regime. Instead, Wibisono joined the ranks of the Indonesian Islamic Union Party (PSII), (Note: Ken Ward claims that Jusuf Wibisono and Soekiman became members of the PSII in 1960, shortly after the dissolution of the Masyumi. However, Wibisono strongly contests this claim, maintaining that he joined the party in mid-1970.) but after the PSII's poor performance in the 1971 Indonesian legislative election, he opted to retire from politics. He died on 15 June 1982 at Dr. Cipto Mangunkusumo Hospital in Jakarta.
