= Benteng program =

Indonesian economic policy

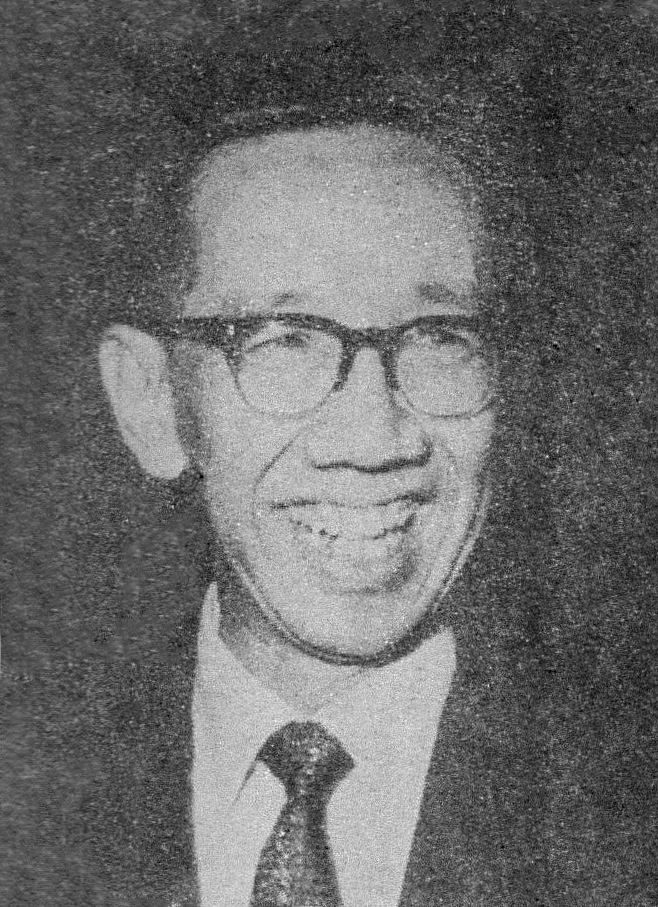
Official portrait of Sumitro Djojohadikusumo, c. 1970s, who initiated the Benteng program

The Benteng program, also known as the Benteng policy, was an Indonesian economic policy which consisted of measures to provide pribumi entrepreneurs with import licenses in order to hasten the development of an indigenous business class. The program was initiated by Industry Minister Sumitro Djojohadikusumo in 1950 and lasted up until Prime Minister Djuanda Kartawidjaja abolished it in 1957.

== Background ==
The 1950s saw increased political pressure to nationalize Dutch private companies that still existed in Indonesia at the conclusion of the Indonesian National Revolution. However, Indonesia still needed significant foreign funding and skills in order to develop the foundation of an economy that can support its population. In February 1950 President Sukarno announced to foreign companies in Indonesia that the recovery of the economy of Indonesia following the revolution requires all available funds, foreign and domestic. In 1953 the Minister of Finance Ong Eng Die stated that the role of foreign companies in the economy of Indonesia needs to be formally clarified in future national development plans.

The program was devised as a means to nurture the role of Indonesian nationals in the economic development while avoiding conflict of interest with foreign companies, especially those from the Netherlands.

== Execution ==
The Benteng program was executed in several steps, with significant changes in each step in terms of economic opportunities and access. Its main program covered imports, as the required funds were the least. Further, the role of Dutch companies were seen to be most significant in this area, especially through large trading companies.

The program started by earmarking the importation of certain goods to pribumi businesses. Requirements for obtaining general import licenses were then changed. In 1950 it was decreed importing trading companies have to have at least 70% of its shares owned by native Indonesians. In May and June 1953, increasing this percentage was considered in debate, which brought up allegations of discrimination against the Tionghoa, resulting in the dissolution of Wilopo's Cabinet.

The program was reviewed in September 1955 by the Burhanuddin Harahap Cabinet and Secretary of Finance Sumitro Djojohadikusumo. Its ethnic-based requirements were scrapped and replaced by downpayment requirements.

The formation of the Karya Cabinet led by Djuanda Kartawidjaja in March and April 1957 signaled the transition to a directed economy under the auspices of Guided Democracy; Benteng program was then officially stopped.
