= Senate of the United States of Indonesia =

Upper chamber of the Parliament of the United States of Indonesia (1949–1950)

Type
- Type: Upper house
- Term limits: None

Leadership
- Speaker: Melkias Agustinus Pellaupessy, East Indonesia, Democratic since 27 February 1950
- Deputy Speaker: Teuku Muhammad Hasan, Republic of Indonesia, Independent since 27 February 1950

Structure
- Seats: 32
- Political groups: PIR (7); Masyumi (6); PNI (3); Catholic (3); SKI (2); PARKI (1); Parindra (2); Democratic (2); Labour (1); Independent (5)

Constitution
- Constitution of the United States of Indonesia

The Senate of the United States of Indonesia was the upper chamber of the Parliament of the United States of Indonesia which, along with the People's Representative Council—the lower chamber — comprised the legislature of the United States of Indonesia.

The composition and powers of the Senate were established by Section Two of the Constitution of the United States of Indonesia (RUSI). The Senate was composed of senators, each of whom represented a single state or autonomous entity of the RUSI in its entirety. Each state, regardless of its population size, was equally represented by two senators. At the time of its formation, there were 32 members in the senate, but prior to the dissolution of the senate, there were only 27 members left, with the speaker of the senate not being counted as the member of the senate (according to the article 85.3 of the constitution). Most of the members that left the senate were local monarchs who had to serve in their respective kingdom (Muhammad Kaharuddin III and Sujadi).

== History ==
With the recognition of the sovereignty of Indonesia on 27 December 1949, the Republic of Indonesia was included in the United States of Indonesia, which comprised all the territory of the former Dutch East Indies with the exception of Netherlands New Guinea, sovereignty over which it was agreed would be retained by the Netherlands until further negotiations with Indonesia.

The Constitution of the United States of Indonesia came into force on 27 December 1949. In its first article, the constitution stated that the sovereignty of Indonesia shall be implemented together with the People's Representative Council and the Senate.

Based on the constitution, on 16 February 1950, the Senate of the United States of Indonesia was formed, and its members were sworn in on the same day.

== Speaker and Deputy Speaker ==
=== Election ===
The election for the speaker and deputy speaker of the Senate was held on 17 February 1950, with Ki Hadjar Dewantara (Republic of Indonesia), Djaidin Purba (East Sumatra), M. A. Pellaupessy (East Indonesia), Tadjuddin Noor (Southeast Kalimantan) and Teuku Muhammad Hasan (Republic of Indonesia) as the candidates. Pellaupessy and Hasan came out as the winner and runner-up of the election, and both were elected as the speaker and the deputy speaker of the Senate.

Candidates	Constituency	Votes
M. A. Pellaupessy	East Indonesia	14
Teuku Muhammad Hasan	Republic of Indonesia	12
Ki Hadjar Dewantara	Republic of Indonesia	1
Tadjuddin Noor	Southeast Kalimantan	0
Djaidin Purba	East Sumatra	0
Abstentions		1
Source: Tim Penyusun Sejarah 1970, p. 98

The speaker and the deputy speaker began to lead the meetings of the Senate since 27 February 1950. Prior to that date, the meetings of the senate was led by the oldest member of the Senate. The oldest member of the Senate at the time was RAA Sujadi (61).

== Membership ==
=== Requirements ===
According to Article 82 of the constitution, the senator shall be at least 30 years old and have never had his or right of election revoked. The senator should also show his credentials from his state.

=== Composition ===
The constitution stipulated that the Senate consists of 32 senators, with 2 senators from each state and region. In reality, only 28 were installed on the afternoon of 16 February 1950. Two senators, Raden Hanan and Anang Abdul Rivai were installed on 20 February 1950 and 5 March 1950. Out of the 32 senators, four officially withdraw from the Senate (Machmud, R. Abdurrasid, Roeslan Wongsokoesoemo, Muhammad Kaharuddin III).

As the speaker of the senate did not count as a member of the Senate, the State of East Indonesia practically has no representation in the Senate. There was no replacement for M.A. Pellaupessy who had been elected as the Speaker and Sultan Kaharuddin III who had withdrawn from the Senate.

== Work accomplished ==
In its six months, there was only one out of the seven federal laws and thirty emergency laws that were passed by the government with the approval of the Senate. The law was the Law No. 7/1950 regarding the enactment of the Provisional Constitution of 1950. Out of the thirty emergency laws, there were twelve emergency laws that were passed by reviewing the consideration from the Senate.

== Bibliography ==
- Djuana, Mohammad; Sulwan (1956), Tata-negara Indonesia:dengan bagian-umum (Government of Indonesia) (in Indonesian), Jakarta: Groningen
- Hilmi Syatria, ed. (1995), Gedung MPR/DPR RI: Sejarah dan Perkembangannya [MPR/DPR RI Building: History and Development] (PDF) (in Indonesian), Jakarta: Tim Panitia Penerbitan Buku Gedung MPR/DPR RI, ISBN 979-8776-003, archived from the original (PDF) on 2020-01-10
- Tim Penyusun Sejarah (1970), Seperempat Abad Dewan Perwakilan Rakyat Republik Indonesia [A Quarter Century of the People's Representative Council of the Republic of Indonesia] (PDF) (in Indonesian), Jakarta: Sekretariat DPR-GR, archived from the original (PDF) on 2023-04-07
- Sri Bntang Pamungkas, ed. (1999). Konstitusi Kita dan Rancangan UUD45 Yang Disempurnakan (in Indonesian). Jakarta: Partai Uni Demokrasi Indonesia.
- Ricklefs, M. C. (2008). A History of Modern Indonesia Since C.1200. Macmillan Education UK. ISBN 978-0-230-54686-8.
