= Tandiono Manu =

Indonesian politician

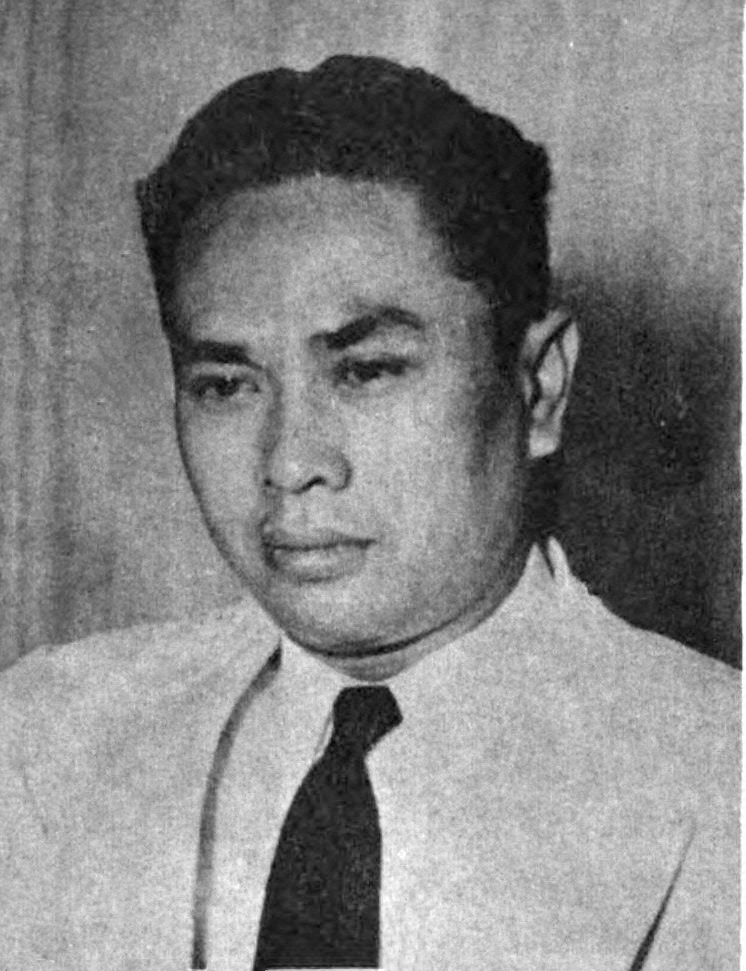

Minister of Agriculture
- In office 6 September 1950 – 27 April 1951
- Prime Minister: Mohammad Natsir
- Preceded by: Sadjarwo Djarwonagoro
- Succeeded by: Suwarto

Minister of Trade and Industry
- In office 21 January 1950 – 6 September 1950
- Prime Minister: Abdul Halim
- Preceded by: Sumitro Djojohadikusumo
- Succeeded by: I.J. Kasimo

Personal details
- Born: 28 June 1913 Banyuwangi, Dutch East Indies
- Died: 30 October 1986 (aged 73)
- Party: Socialist Party of Indonesia

Tandiono Manu (28 June 1913 – 30 October 1986) was an Indonesian politician who served as Minister of Agriculture in the Natsir Cabinet between 1950 and 1951, and Minister of Trade and Industry within the Halim Cabinet of the Republic of Indonesia during the United States of Indonesia period.

== Early life and education ==
Tandiono was born in Banyuwangi, today in East Java, on 28 June 1913. He was an only child, and his father Martoprawiro worked as an irrigation department official. He completed elementary school (Hollandsch-Inlandsche School) in Jember and secondary school (Meer Uitgebreid Lager Onderwijs) in Surabaya, before continuing to the Rechtshogeschool (law institute) in Batavia. He graduated from there in 1941. During his studies, he was active in youth organizations such as Jong Java and the Unitas Studiorum Indonesiensis.

== Career ==
The Japanese occupation of the Dutch East Indies began shortly after Tandiono's graduation, and he initially worked in a tax office before he was reassigned to the judiciary of the military administration, serving in Semarang. He continued to work in the court system following the proclamation of Indonesian independence, initially in Yogyakarta until he was appointed resident of Bojonegoro in 1947. He participated in guerrilla warfare against the Dutch following Operation Kraai. During this period, he was also active in Barisan Tani Indonesia, the principal peasant organization of the country.

After the transfer of sovereignty, he was briefly appointed as vice governor of East Java (on 1 January 1950) until he was appointed Minister of Trade and Industry in the Halim Cabinet on 21 January. After the United States of Indonesia was dissolved, he became Minister of Agriculture in the Natsir Cabinet, as a member of the Indonesian Socialist Party. He was later appointed as a director in the Indonesian subsidiary of the London Sumatra plantation firm. He enjoyed a close relationship with his predecessor and then-sitting minister Sadjarwo Djarwonagoro, and British firms at the time were attempting to cultivate relationships with the Indonesian government.

During the New Order period, he took part in a political discussion group that involved Islamists, former generals (such as Tahi Bonar Simatupang), and other political figures.

== Death ==
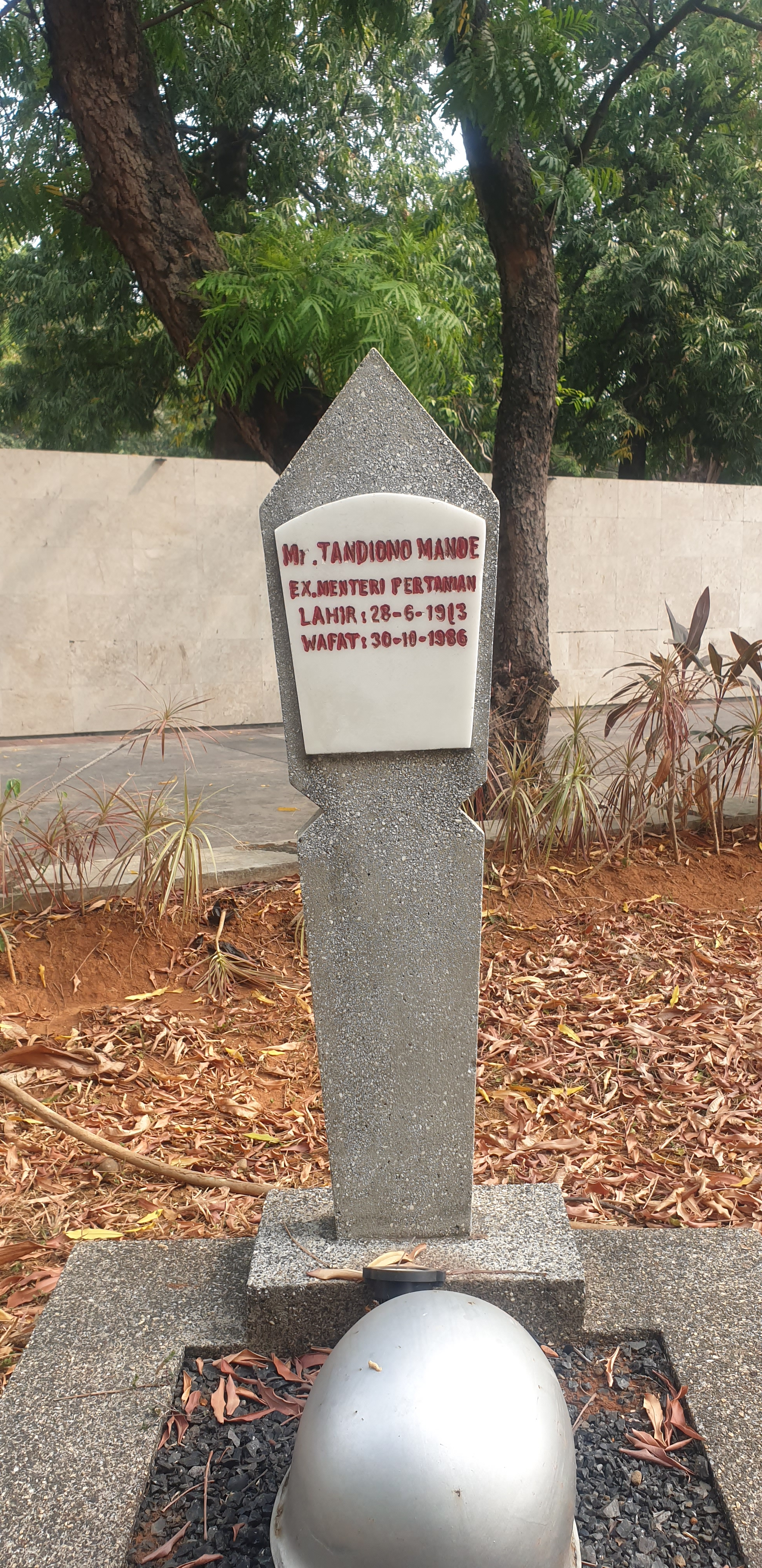
Tandiono Manu's grave in Kalibata Heroes' Cemetery

He died on 30 October 1986 and was buried at the Kalibata Heroes' Cemetery.
