= Soekiman Cabinet =

Cabinet of Indonesia (1951–1952)

Soekiman Cabinet Kabinet Soekiman
- Cabinet of Indonesia
- 27 April 1951 – 3 April 1952
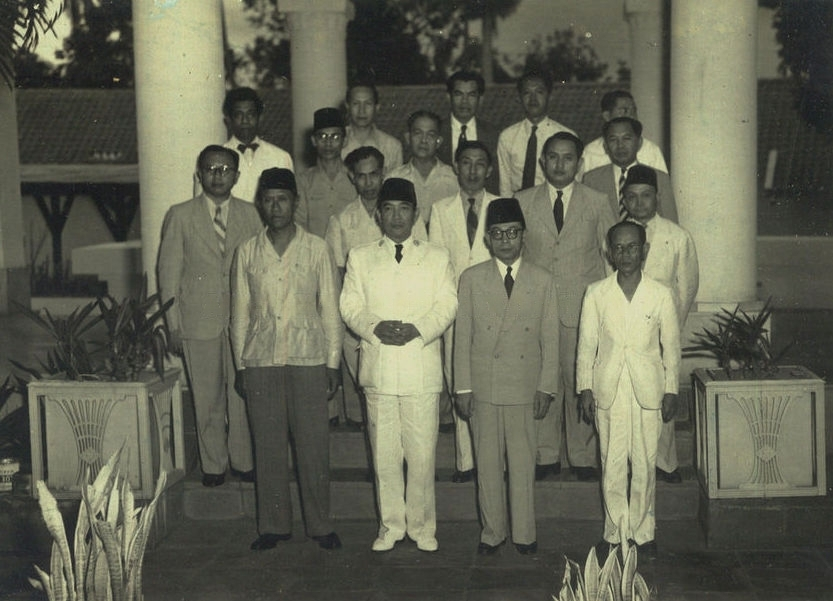
- Members of the cabinet with President Sukarno
- Date formed: 27 April 1951
- Date dissolved: 3 April 1952

People and organisations
- President: Sukarno
- Prime Minister: Soekiman Wirjosandjojo
- Member parties: Masyumi; PNI; PIR; Catholic; Labour; Parkindo; Democratic; Parindra

History
- Predecessor: Natsir
- Successor: Wilopo

The Soekiman Cabinet (Indonesian: Kabinet Soekiman) (Note: Sometimes referred to as the Soekiman–Suwirjo Cabinet (Indonesian: Kabinet Soekiman–Suwirjo).) was the cabinet of Indonesia from April 1951 to April 1952. It was a coalition government consisting of the Masyumi Party, the Indonesian National Party (PNI), and several smaller parties. Soekiman Wirjosandjojo led the cabinet as prime minister.

== Formation ==
On 21 March 1951, the Natsir cabinet fell due to loss of political support. Five days later, President Sukarno asked Indonesian National Party (PNI) leader and parliamentary chairman Sartono to form a coalition cabinet, but he admitted failure on 18 April. On the same day, Sukarno asked the chairman of the Masyumi Party party council Soekiman Wirjosandjojo and PNI chairman Sidik Djojosukarto to try, giving them five days, then an extra three days. Both men agreed that both parties would have same number of seats. However, there was disagreement over the post of prime minister. Eventually the PNI gave in to Soekiman's demand for a Masjumi prime minister providing this was not Natsir, who had held the position in the previous cabinet. Sukarno subsequently suggested Soekiman himself for the role, which he accepted. This led to a disagreement between the Soekiman and Natsir factions within the party, and the Natsir-led Masjumi executive body refused to accept Sidik and Soekiman's suggested composition for the cabinet. As a result, no members of Natsir's faction were appointed.

== Composition ==
The composition of the cabinet was announced on 26 April. Like its predecessor, it was based around a PNI-Masjumi nucleus. However, the Masjumi members were supporters of the Soekiman faction in the party, and the opposing Natsir-led faction criticized the make-up of the new cabinet. Only six members from the previous cabinet were given posts. The composition was as follows:

=== Cabinet leadership ===
- Prime Minister: Soekiman Wirjosandjojo (Masyumi Party)
- Deputy Prime Minister: Soewirjo (Indonesian National Party – PNI)

=== Cabinet members ===
- Minister of Foreign Affairs: Achmad Subardjo (Masyumi Party)
- Minister of Home Affairs: Iskaq Tjokroadisurjo (Indonesian National Party - PNI)
- Minister of Defense: Sewaka (PIR)
- Minister of Justice: Muhammad Yamin
- Minister of Finance: Jusuf Wibisono (Masyumi Party)
- Minister of Information: Arnold Mononutu
- Minister of Agriculture: Suwarto (PKRI)
- Minister of Trade and Industry: Sujono Hadinoto (Indonesian National Party - PNI)
- Minister of Transportation: Djuanda Kartawidjaja
- Minister of Public Works and Power: Ukar Bratakusumah (Indonesian National Party - PNI)
- Minister of Labor: Iskandar Tedjasukmana (Labour Party)
- Minister of Social Affairs: Samsuddin (Masyumi Party)
- Minister of Education & Culture: Wongsonegoro (PIR)
- Minister of Religious Affairs: Wahid Hasyim (Masyumi Party)
- Minister of Health: Dr. Johannes Leimena (Parkindo)
- Minister of General Affairs: M. A. Pellaupessy (Democratic)
- Minister of Employee Affairs: R. P. Soeroso (Parindra)

=== Changes ===
- Sumitro Kolopaking was the original Defense Minister, but refused the appointment and was replaced by Sewaka on 9 May 1951.
- On 19 May, the Ministry of Trade and Industry became the Ministry of Economic Affairs. Economics Minister Sujono Hadinoto was dismissed on 16 July and replaced by Wilopo.
- Justice Minister Muhammad Yamin resigned on 14 June. General Affairs Minister Pellaupessy was also appointed Minister of Justice ad interim. Mohammad Nasrun was appointed Justice Minister on 20 November.
- A Ministry of Agrarian Affairs was established on 20 November 1951 with Gondokusomo appointed Minister of Agrarian Affairs. However, Gondokusomo died on 6 March 1952 and had not been replaced by the time the cabinet was dissolved.
- While Transport Minister Djuanda was overseas, Public Works and Manpower Minister Ukar Bratakusumah was appointed Minister of Transport ad interim effective from 13 December 1951.

== Cabinet program ==
The cabinet announced a six-point program with a stronger emphasis on public order and with less emphasis on early elections than its predecessor. The program was as follows:

1. Take firm measures to guarantee security and order. Reform the organizations that exercise state power.
2. Draw up and implement a national prosperity program to improve people's welfare in the short term.
3. Complete preparations for a general election to establish a constitutional assembly. Hold this election in the near future. Accelerate the implementation of regional autonomy.
4. Pass laws on the recognition of trade unions and on collective agreements.
5. Implement a free and active foreign policy aimed at bringing about peace. Implement the Dutch-Indonesian union as a normal international treaty.
6. Incorporate Western New Guinea into the Republic of Indonesia at the earliest opportunity.

It also announced end-of-Ramadan bonuses and monthly rice assistance packets for civil servants, and decided to nationalise the Dutch-owned Java Bank (De Javasche Bank), which at the time was Indonesian's circulation bank. In August 1951, the cabinet embarked on aggressive mass arrests of communists, leftists and Chinese Indonesians.
