= Sujono Hadinoto =

Indonesian politician, ambassador, academic, and lawyer (1915–1977)

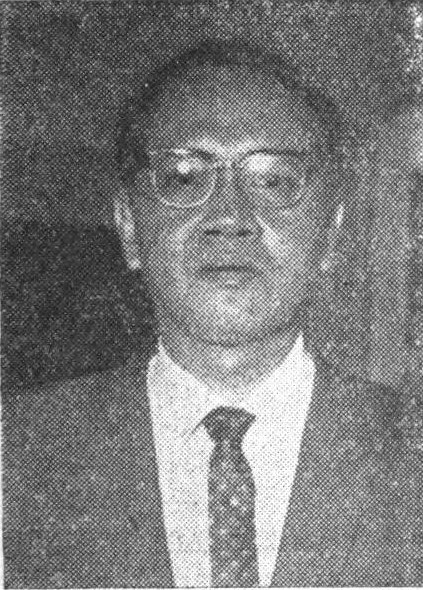
- Official portrait, 1964

2nd Ambassador of Indonesia to Hungary
- In office 12 October 1966 – 4 April 1970
- Preceded by: Sarino Mangunpranoto
- Succeeded by: Roeslan Baboe

8th Minister of Economic Affairs
- In office 27 April 1951 – 16 July 1951
- Prime Minister: Soekiman Wirjosandjojo
- Preceded by: Sumitro Djojohadikusumo
- Succeeded by: Wilopo

4th Chairman of the Indonesian National Party
- In office November 1947 – 5 May 1950
- Preceded by: Adnan Kapau Gani
- Succeeded by: Sidik Djojosukarto

Advisory offices
- 1964–1966: Deputy Chairman of the Supreme Advisory Council
- 1964–1966: Member of the Supreme Advisory Council

Personal details
- Born: 28 June 1915 Blora, Djepara-Rembang Residency, Dutch East Indies
- Died: 29 December 1977 (aged 62) Jakarta, Indonesia
- Party: Indonesian National Party
- Education: Rechts Hogeschool (Mr.)

Sujono Hadinoto (EVO: Soejono Hadinoto; 28 June 1915 – 29 December 1977) was an Indonesian politician, ambassador, academic, and lawyer. Born in Blora Regency, he studied law in the Rechts Hogeschool. After graduating, he became active in the Indonesian independence movement. During the Indonesian National Revolution, Sujono became a member of the Indonesian National Party, later serving as party chairman from 1947 until 1950. Following the recognition of Indonesian sovereignty in 1949, he served as Minister of Economic Affairs in the Soekiman Cabinet. He later became dean of the Faculty of Law of the University of Indonesia. In 1964, he was appointed to the Supreme Advisory Council by Sukarno, and in 1966, he was appointed Ambassador of Indonesia to Hungary. He served as ambassador until 1970. He died on 29 December 1977 in Jakarta and was buried in Bogor.

== Early life and career ==
Sujono Hadinoto was born on 28 June 1915, in Blora, Central Java, in what was then the Dutch East Indies (now Indonesia). He began his education at a Hollandsch-Inlandsche School and a Hogere Burgerschool, before advancing to the Rechts Hogeschool in Batavia, graduating in 1942. Sujono was also active in several nationalist youth organizations before the proclamation of Indonesian independence. During the Dutch colonial period, he worked as a superintendent at a company owned by the Mangkunegaran, before opening a law practice. He then worked for the Yogyakarta Sultanate as a head of a department.

== Political career ==
Sometime before January 1946, Sujono founded the People's Sovereignty Party (Partai Kedaulatan Rakyat) in Yogyakarta, which merged with several other parties to form the Indonesian National Party following a conference at Kediri in late January 1946. In early November 1947, Sujono was appointed as chairman of the Indonesian National Party. Sujono later became a member of the Indonesian delegation in the 1949 Dutch–Indonesian Round Table Conference. He joined the People's Representative Council of the United States of Indonesia, representing the Republic of Indonesia.

In 1949, Sujono wrote a booklet, Dari Ekonomi Kolonial ke Ekonomi Nasional ("From a Colonial to a National Economy"), which espoused a transition from a Dutch-controlled economy to an Indonesian one. The booklet's title became a common phrase throughout the 1950s. He resigned from his office on 16 July 1951 for health reasons and was replaced by Wilopo. In conversations with American diplomats, Sujono indicated that he was against the nationalization of foreign petroleum companies operating in Indonesia. In 1950, he also joined the Indonesian delegation led by Lambertus Nicodemus Palar to Moscow to establish relations with the Soviet Union.

Sujono later became a professor and then dean at the Faculty of Law, University of Indonesia. He joined the Supreme Advisory Council in 1964, as its vice-chairman. He became the Ambassador to Hungary from 12 October 1966 until 4 April 1970.

He died on 29 December 1977 at Dr. Cipto Mangunkusumo Hospital in Jakarta. He was buried the following day in Bogor, West Java.

== Bibliography ==
- Lindblad, J. Thomas (2008). Bridges to New Business: The Economic Decolonization of Indonesia. National University of Singapore Press. ISBN 978-9971-69-477-7.
- Kepartaian di Indonesia (in Indonesian). Ministry of Information of Indonesia. 1950.
