= Burhanuddin Harahap Cabinet =

Indonesian Cabinet 1955–1956

Burhanuddin Harahap Cabinet Kabinet Burhanuddin Harahap
- 16th Cabinet of Indonesia
- 1955–1956
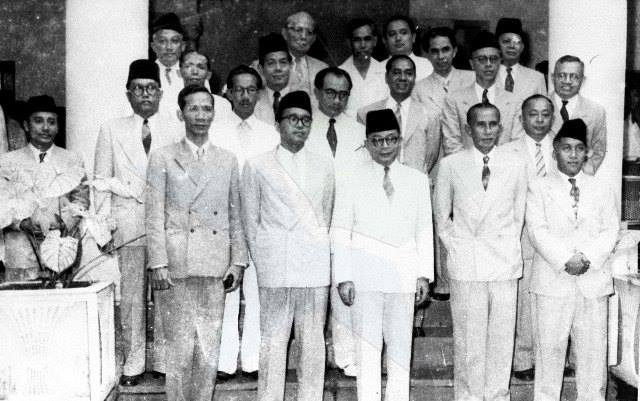
- Prime Minister Burhanuddin Harahap (front row, second from the left) and Vice President Mohammad Hatta (front row, centre) with the newly-elected cabinet in Jakarta, 12 August 1955
- Date formed: 12 August 1955
- Date dissolved: 24 March 1956

People and organisations
- President: Sukarno
- Prime Minister: Burhanuddin Harahap
- Deputy Prime Minister: R. Djanoe Ismadi; Harsono Tjokroaminoto
- No. of ministers: 23
- Member party: Masyumi; Democratic; Nahdlatul Ulama; Socialist Party of Indonesia; Catholic Party; Labour; National People's Party; Great Indonesia Unity Party – Hazairin; Indonesia People's Party; Indonesian Christian Party; Independent
- Status in legislature: Majority coalition 127 / 235
- Opposition party: Indonesian National Party; Great Indonesia Party – Wongsonegoro; Indonesian People's Union Party; Progressive Union; Communist Party of Indonesia; Central All-Indonesian Workers Organization; Peasants Front of Indonesia; Murba Party; Islamic Education Movement
- Opposition leader: Sidik Djojosukarto (1955); Sarmidi Mangunsarkoro (1955–1956)

History
- Outgoing election: 1955 Indonesian legislative election
- Predecessor: Ali Sastroamidjojo I Cabinet
- Successor: Ali Sastroamidjojo II Cabinet

The Burhanuddin Harahap Cabinet (Indonesian: Kabinet Burhanuddin Harahap) was an Indonesian cabinet, named after the prime minister, that served from 12 August 1955 until 24 March 1956.

== Composition ==
=== Cabinet Leadership ===
- Prime Minister: Burhanuddin Harahap (Masyumi Party)
- First Deputy Prime Minister: R. Djanoe Ismadi (PIR-Hazairin)
- Second Deputy Prime Minister: Harsono Tjokroaminoto (Indonesian Islamic Union Party - PSII)

=== Cabinet Members ===
- Minister of Foreign Affairs: Ide Anak Agung Gde Agung (Democratic)
- Minister of Home Affairs: Soenarjo (Nahdlatul Ulama - NU)
- Minister of Defense: Burhanuddin Harahap (Masyumi)
- Minister of Justice: Lukman Wiriadinata (Socialist Party of Indonesia - PSI)
- Minister of Information: Sjamsuddin Sutan Makmur (PIR-Hazairin)
- Minister of Finance: Sumitro Djojohadikusumo
- Minister of Agriculture: Mohammad Sardjan (Masyumi)
- Minister of Economic Affairs: Ignatius J. Kasimo
- Minister of Transport: F. Laoh (PRN)
- Minister of Public Works and Power: R. P. Soeroso (Parindra)
- Minister of Labor: Iskandar Tedjasukmana (Labour Party)
- Minister of Social Affairs: Soedibjo (Indonesian Islamic Union Party - PSII)
- Minister of Education & Culture: Soewandi (Parindra)
- Minister of Religious Affairs: Mohammad Iljas (Nahdlatul Ulama - NU)
- Minister of Health: Dr. Johannes Leimena (Parkindo)
- Minister of Agrarian Affairs: Gunawan (PRN)
- State Minister: Abdul Hakim (Masyumi Party)
- State Minister: Sutomo (PRI)
- State Minister: Coomala Noor (PIR-Hazairin)
- Junior Minister of Transport: Asraruddin (Labour Party)

== Changes ==
On 19 January 1956, both ministers from the PSII, namely Second Deputy Prime Minister Harsono Tjokroaminoto and Minister of Social Affairs Soedibjo, resigned, as did both NU ministers, namely Minister of Home Affairs Soenarjo and Minister of Religious Affairs Mohammad Iljas. Sutomo also became ad interim Social Minister, Minister of Public Works and Power R. P. Soeroso also became ad interim Interior Minister and Minister of Agriculture: Mohammad Sardjan also became ad interim Religious Affairs Minister.
