= Melkias Agustinus Pellaupessy =

Indonesian politician

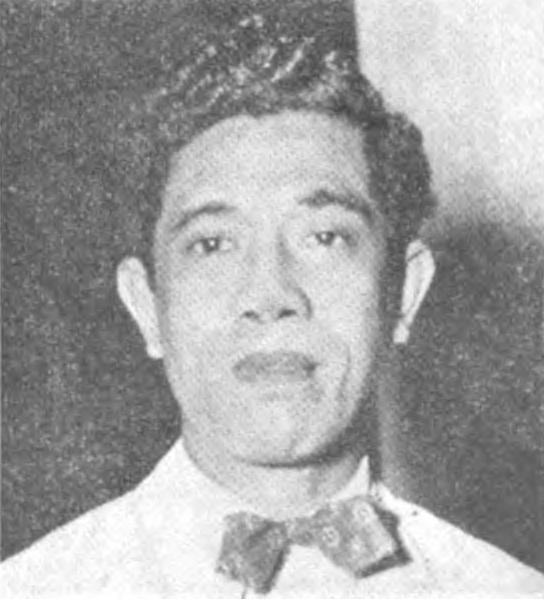

Speaker of the Senate of the United States of Indonesia
- In office 25 February 1950 – 16 August 1950
- President: Sukarno

Minister of Information
- In office 6 September 1950 – 6 September 1950
- President: Sukarno
- Preceded by: Wiwoho Purbohadidjojo
- Succeeded by: Arnold Mononutu

Minister of Justice (ad interim)
- In office 14 June 1951 – 20 November 1951
- President: Sukarno
- Preceded by: Mohammad Yamin
- Succeeded by: Mohammad Nasroen

State Minister
- In office 27 April 1951 – 3 April 1952
- President: Sukarno
- Preceded by: Harsono Tjokroaminoto
- Succeeded by: Soeroso

Personal details
- Born: 15 May 1906 Ambon, Dutch Celebes, Dutch East Indies
- Spouse: Susanna Elisabeth Judith Metekohy (m. 1939)

Melkias Agustinus Pellaupessy was an Indonesian politician born in Ambon, Dutch East Indies on 15 May 1906.

== Political career ==
At the age of 19, he entered public service as an official of the Home Department. From 1937 up to the outbreak of World War II, he held the position of head of the administration division of that department.

After World War II, he served as secretary to the resident commissioner of South Sulawesi. In August 1946, he became trade commissioner and held this position until his nomination as representative of the State of East Indonesia to Jakarta in April 1948. In August 1948, he was appointed as the resident of the South Moluccas. In September 1949, he took part in the Round Table Conference at The Hague as a member of the Federal Consultative Assembly, representing the pro-federal faction.

After returning to Indonesia from The Hague, Pellaupessy was attached as an expert in the federal affairs to the office of the Prime Minister of East Indonesia. On 25 February 1950, he was elected as the Speaker of the Senate of the United States of Indonesia and was officially installed on 27 February 1950.

During his term of office, Pellaupessy was sent abroad several times to represent Indonesia in international conferences. In October 1947, he went to the Netherlands to confer with official and private instances there on the economic problems with regard to the reconstruction of Indonesia. In 1947, he was appointed as the Vice Chairman of the Netherlands Delegation to the International Trade Conference in Havana.

After the formation of the Natsir Cabinet, the first cabinet after the recognition of Indonesia, he was appointed as the Minister of Information. He was also appointed as the State Minister in the Sukiman Cabinet.

== Bibliography ==
- Bastiaans, W. Ch. J. (1950), Personalia (PDF), Jakarta
- Tim Penyusun Sejarah (1970), Seperempat Abad Dewan Perwakilan Rakjat Republik Indonesia [A Quarter Century of the People's Representative Council of the Republic of Indonesia] (PDF) (in Indonesian), Jakarta: Sekretariat DPR-GR
- Ministry of Information (1954), Kami Perkenalkan [We Introduce] (PDF) (in Indonesian), Jakarta: Archipel Printers & Editors
