= Ong Eng Die =

Chinese-Indonesian politician and economist (born 1910)

- 王永利
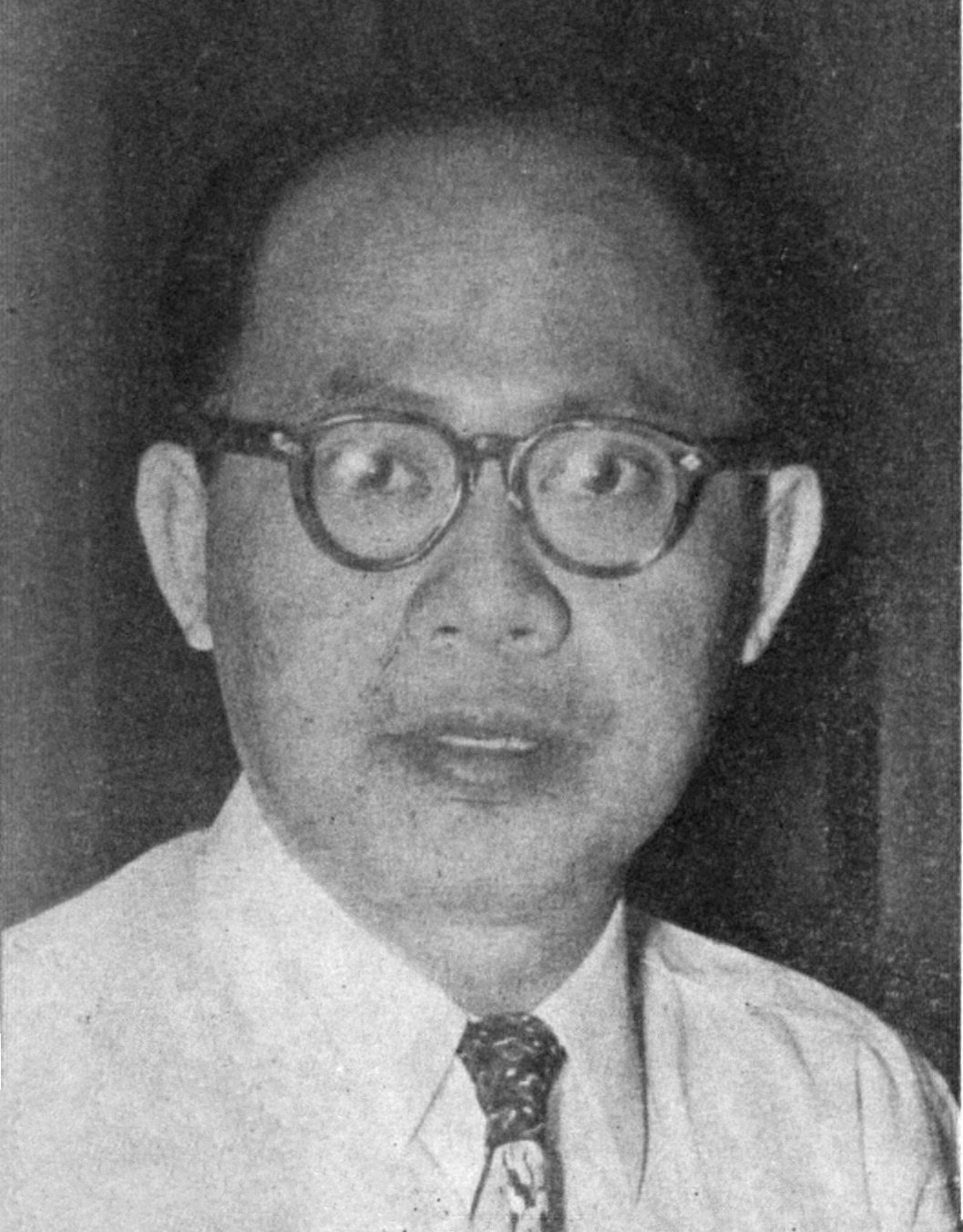
- Official portrait, 1954

18th Minister of Finance
- In office 30 July 1953 – 12 August 1955
- Prime Minister: Ali Sastroamidjojo
- Preceded by: Sumitro Djojohadikusumo
- Succeeded by: Sumitro Djojohadikusumo

Personal details
- Born: 20 June 1910 Gorontalo, North Sulawesi, Dutch East Indies
- Died: Unknown
- Party: Indonesian National Party
- Spouse: Gertrud Wilhelmine Höhnerbach
- Children: 2 sons
- Parent(s): Ong Teng Hoen, Luitenant der Chinezen (father); Soei Djok Thie Nio (mother)
- Education: Amsterdam University

Ong Eng Die (Chinese: 王永利; pinyin: Wáng Yǒnglì; Pe̍h-ōe-jī: Ông íng-lī; born 20 June 1910, date of death unknown), was a Chinese Indonesian politician and economist. Ong was born on 20 June 1910 in Gorontalo, Indonesia into the 'Cabang Atas' or the Chinese gentry of colonial Indonesia. His father, Ong Teng Hoen, served as Luitenant der Chinezen of Gorontalo, thus heading the local Chinese civil bureaucracy, from his appointment in 1924 until the Japanese invasion in 1942.

His privileged background allowed him access to Dutch schooling. He later studied at the University of Amsterdam's economics department in 1940 and obtained his doctorate at the same university in 1943 upon completing his dissertation Chineezen in Nederlandsch-Indië, een Sociografie van een Indonesische Bevolkingsgroep. In 1946 he returned to Indonesia and started work at the Central Bank of Indonesia in Yogyakarta. From 1947 to 1948 he was Deputy Minister of Finance in the administration of the first Prime Minister Amir Sjarifuddin. He was adviser to the Indonesian delegation during the negotiations that led to the Renville Agreement. He joined the Indonesian National Party (PNI) and in 1955 became Minister of Finance in the Ali Sastroamidjojo Cabinet. After his resignation, he was placed under house arrest on charges of corruption in August 1955.

He was arrested in 1957 on charges of corruption when he was Minister of Finance in the Ali Sastroamidjojo Cabinet. He was accused of providing credit, during his office, of 20,000,000 rupiah to Bank Umum Nasional in Bandung, a bank established by himself and others in 1952, in which he himself was a major shareholder. He returned to Amsterdam, Netherlands, in 1964. He and his German wife, Gertrud Wilhelmine Höhnerbach, were granted Dutch citizenship in 1967, when his occupation was listed as businessman. He and his wife continued to live in Amsterdam until their divorce in 1975, upon which he moved to The Hague. The couple had two sons.
