= Halim Cabinet =

Cabinet of Indonesia (1950)

Halim Cabinet Kabinet Halim
- Cabinet of Indonesia
- 21 January 1950 – 6 September 1950
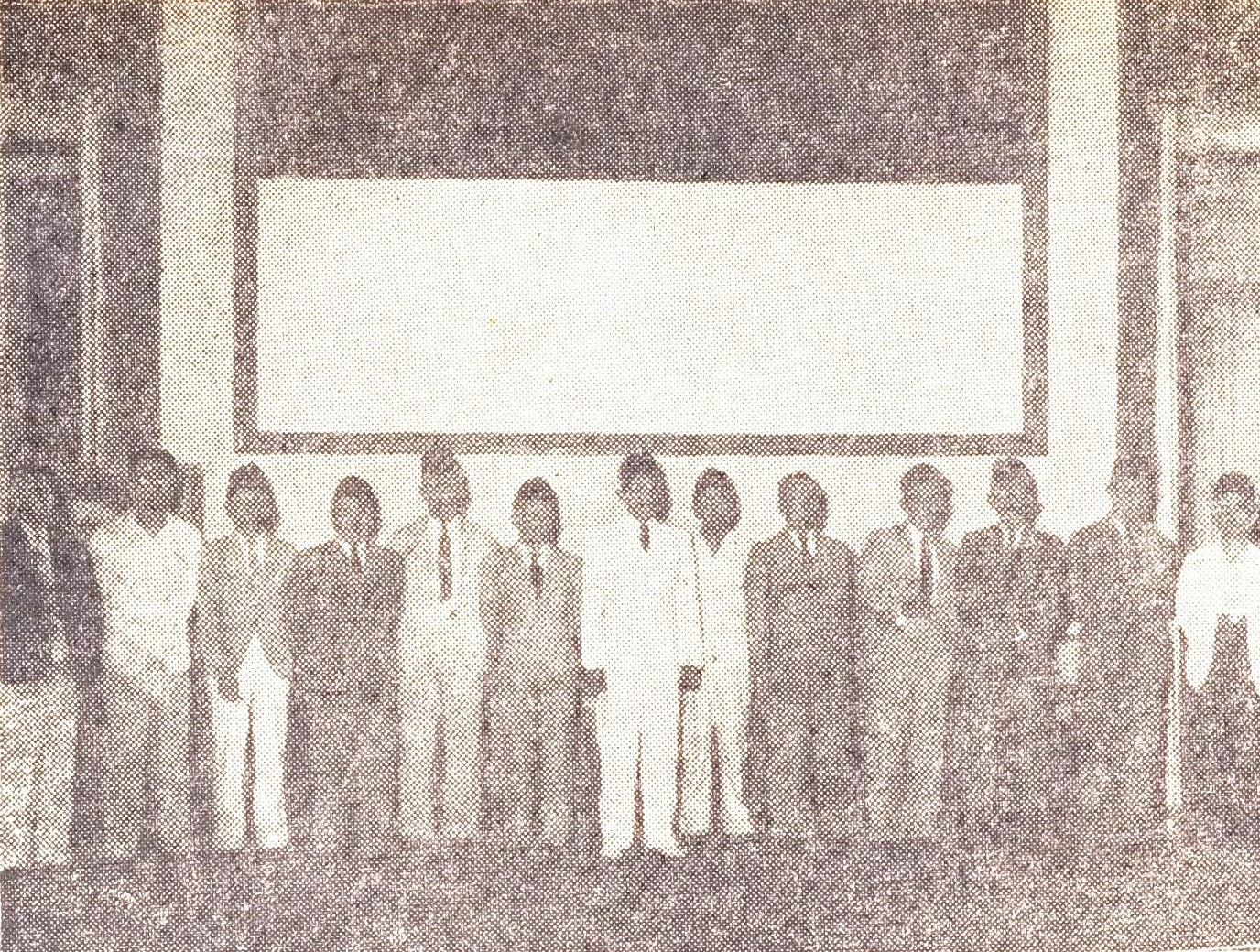
- Members of the cabinet with President Assaat
- Date formed: 21 January 1950
- Date dissolved: 6 September 1950

People and organisations
- President: Assaat
- Prime Minister: Abdul Halim
- Member parties: Masyumi; PNI; PSI; Parkindo; Labour; BTI; PIR

History
- Predecessor: Susanto
- Successor: Natsir

The Halim Cabinet (Indonesian: Kabinet Halim) was the second and final cabinet of the State of the Republic of Indonesia, one of the 16 states in the United States of Indonesia. It served from 21 January until 15 August 1950, when the United States of Indonesia was dissolved and Indonesia once again became a unitary state.

== Composition ==
=== Cabinet Leadership ===
- Prime Minister: Abdul Halim
- Deputy Prime Minister, also responsible for general affairs: Abdul Hakim (Masyumi Party)

=== Departmental Ministers ===
- Minister of Home Affairs: Soesanto Tirtoprodjo (Indonesian National Party – PNI)
- Minister of Justice: A.G. Pringgodigdo
- Minister of Information: Wiwoho Purbohadidjojo (Masyumi Party)
- Minister of Finance: Lukman Hakim (Indonesian National Party – PNI)
- Minister of Agriculture: Sadjarwo Djarwonagoro (Indonesian Peasants Front - BTI)
- Minister of Trade and Industry: Tandiono Manu (Socialist Party of Indonesia - PSI)
- Minister of Public Works and Transport: Mananti Sitompul (Indonesian Christian Party, Parkindo)
- Minister of Labor: Ma'as (Labour Party)
- Minister of Social Affairs: Hamdani (Socialist Party of Indonesia - PSI)
- Minister of Societal Development: Sugondo Djojopuspito (Socialist Party of Indonesia - PSI)
- Minister of Education & Culture: S. Mangunsarkoro (Indonesian National Party – PNI)
- Minister of Religious Affairs: Fakih Usman (Masyumi Party)
- Minister of Health: Dr. Sutopo (PIR)
