= Democratic Fraction (Indonesia) =

Indonesian parliamentary group (1950s)

Democratic Fraction Fraksi Demokrat
- Leader: Benjamin Sahetapy Engel
- Founded: 27 Februari 1950
- Dissolved: 26 Maret 1956
- Headquarters: Jakarta
- Ideology: Anti–radical nationalism
- DPRS (1954): 9 / 235

The Democratic Fraction (Indonesian: Fraksi Demokrat) was a parliamentary grouping in the Provisional House of Representatives. The fraction consisted of former leaders of the Federal Consultative Assembly (BFO) from East Indonesia. It was opposed to radical nationalism and frequently cooperated with the Great Indonesia Unity Party (PIR). In 1954, the Democratic Fraction had nine seats in the House.

== Notable members ==
- M. A. Pellaupessy, Minister of General Affairs (1951–1952)
- Ide Anak Agung Gde Agung, Minister of Foreign Affairs (1955–1956)
