= First Ali Sastroamidjojo Cabinet =

Indonesian Cabinet 1953–1955

First Ali Sastroamidjojo Cabinet Kabinet Ali Sastroamidjojo I
- 15th Cabinet of Indonesia
- 1953–1955
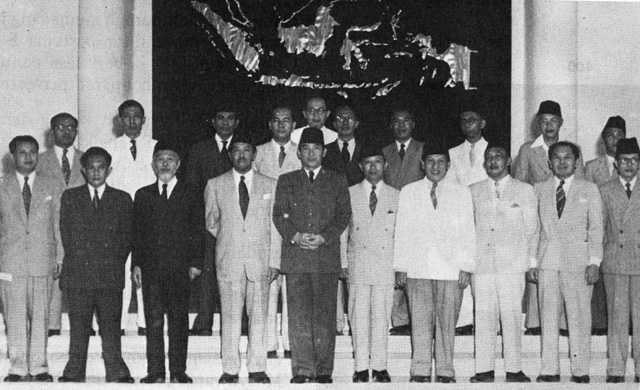
- Date formed: 30 July 1953
- Date dissolved: 12 August 1955

People and organisations
- Head of state: Sukarno
- Head of government: Ali Sastroamidjojo
- No. of ministers: 20 ministers
- Member party: PNI; Masyumi; PSII; Catholic; PIR; Labour; Parkindo; Independent
- Opposition party: Masyumi

History
- Predecessor: Wilopo Cabinet
- Successor: Burhanuddin Harahap Cabinet

The First Ali Sastroamidjojo Cabinet (Indonesian: Kabinet Ali Sastroamidjojo I) was an Indonesian cabinet named after the prime minister, and also known as 'Kabinet IV', that served from 30 July 1953 until 12 August 1955.

== Composition ==
=== Cabinet Leadership ===
- Prime Minister: Ali Sastroamidjojo (Indonesian National Party – PNI)
- First Deputy Prime Minister: Wongsonegoro (Great Indonesia Unity Party – PIR)
- Second Deputy Prime Minister: Zainul Arifin (Nahdlatul Ulama - NU)

== Cabinet Members ==
- Minister of Foreign Affairs: Sunario (Indonesian National Party – PNI)
- Minister of Home Affairs: Hazairin (PIR)
- Minister of Defense: Iwa Kusumasumantri (Progressive Faction)
- Minister of Justice: Djody Gondokusumo (PRN)
- Minister of Information: Dr. F. L. Tobing (SKI)
- Minister of Finance: Ong Eng Die (Indonesian National Party – PNI)
- Minister of Agriculture: Sadjarwo Djarwonagoro (BTI)
- Minister of Economic Affairs: Iskaq Tjokroadisurjo (Indonesian National Party – PNI)
- Minister of Transport: Abikusno Tjokrosujono (Indonesian Islamic Union Party - PSII)
- Minister of Public Works: Roosseno (PIR)
- Minister of Labor: Sutan Muchtar Abidin (Labour Party)
- Minister of Social Affairs: Suroso (Parindra)
- Minister of Education & Culture: Muhammad Yamin
- Minister of Religious Affairs: Masjkur (Nahdlatul Ulama - NU)
- Minister of Health ad interim: Dr. F. L. Tobing (SKI)
- State Minister for National Prosperity: Sudibjo (Indonesian Islamic Union Party - PSII)
- State Minister for Agrarian Affairs: Mohammad Hanafiah (Nahdlatul Ulama - NU)

== Changes ==
- State Minister for National Prosperity Sudibjo resigned on 14 September 1953 and First Deputy Prime Minister Wongsonegoro was appointed as his ad interim replacement.
- Transport Minister Abikusono resigned on 14 September 1953. Public Works and Manpower Minister Roosseno took over his responsibilities temporarily until he was formally appointed on 2 October. His previous position was filled by Mohammad Hassan (PSSI) on 12 October. On the same day, Dr. Lie Kiat Teng (alias Mohammad Ali) (PSII) was appointed Minister of Health, replacing Dr. F. L. Tobing.
- On 23 October 1954, First Deputy Prime Minister and interim Prosperity Minister Wongsonegoro, Transport Minister Roosseno resigned and Interior Minister Hazairin all resigned. Prime Minister Ali Sastroamidjojo took over the responsibilities of the Deputy Prime Minister and Transport Minister, while Second Deputy Prime Minister Zainul Arifin took over the responsibilities of the Interior and Public Prosperity Ministers. This left only one deputy prime minister for the remainder of the cabinet's term of office.
- On 8 November 1954, Minister of Economic Affairs Iskaq Tjokroadisurjo resigned and was replaced by Rooseno. On the same day, Siradjuddin (Perti) was appointed State Minister for National Prosperity, replacing ad interim Minister Zainul Arifin.
- On 19 November 1954, State Minister for Agrarian Affairs Mohammad Hanafiah resigned and was replaced by I Gusti Gde Rake (PRN). On the same day, A. K. Gani (PNI) was appointed Minister of Transport and Soenarjo (NU) was appointed Interior Minister.
- On 13 July 1955, Minister of Defense Iwa Kusumasumantri resigned. Deputy Prime Minister Zainul Arifin became ad interim Defense Minister.
