= Pemandangan =

Defunct Indonesian newspaper

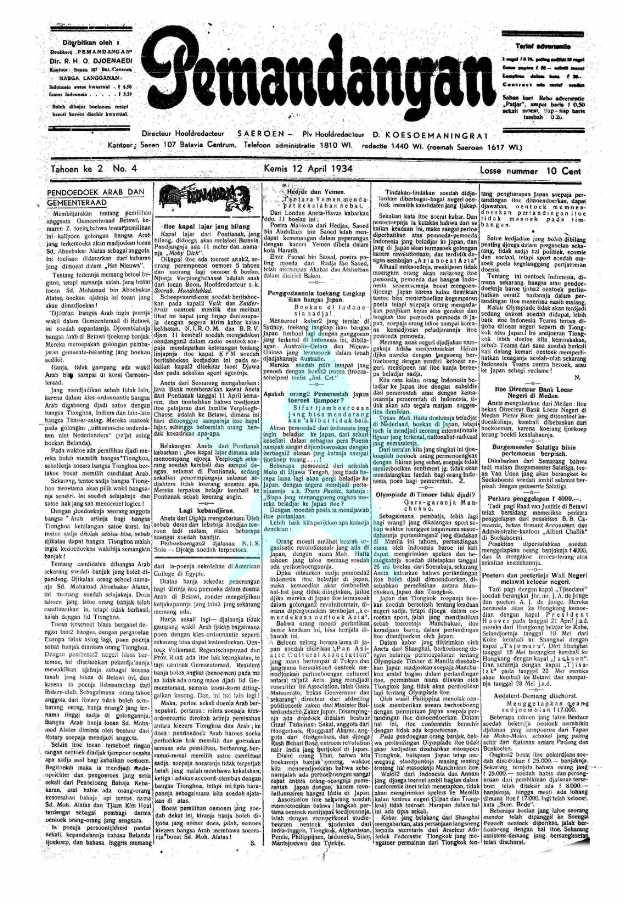
- Front page of Pemandangan, 12 April 1934
- Type: Daily newspaper
- Format: Broadsheet
- Founder: Saeroen
- Founded: 8 April 1933
- Ceased publication: 1958
- Language: Indonesian
- Headquarters: Batavia (later Jakarta)

Pemandangan (transl. The View) was a daily newspaper published in the Dutch East Indies (and later Indonesia) between 1933 and 1958. It was one of the few local newspapers which was initially allowed to operate during the Japanese occupation of the Dutch East Indies.

== History ==
The newspaper was first published on 8 April 1933 by journalist Saeroen. In the first few months after the first issue, the sales of the newspaper could not cover expenditures, and the newspaper received financial support from local plantation owner Oene Djoenaidi. Saeroen would write editorials in Pemandangan under the pen name "Kampret" (bat), but these editorials resulted in Pemandangan being censored by the Dutch East Indies government. It also ceased publication for a week between 17 and 24 May 1940, due to censorship.

Pemandangan would continue to publish following the Japanese invasion of the Dutch East Indies, and was the only newspaper to continue publication during the early occupation period without any shutdowns. During the occupation period, it was the chief competitor of the Japanese-sponsored newspaper Asia Raya. Pemandangan had a stance of being neutral with respect to political parties, though it maintained a nationalist stance. Around that time, the paper had a daily circulation of 7,000. The paper was censored at least twice during the occupation - in both cases due to images of Japanese Emperor Hirohito being obscured by the Japanese flag and both resulting in the arrest of editor-in-chief Soemanang Soerjowinoto.

In the aftermath of the Pacific War and during the Indonesian National Revolution, Djoenaidi enlisted journalist Rosihan Anwar to use Pemandangan's existing printing facilities to publish another newspaper, Pedoman. In 1953, Pemandangan was accused of leaking national secrets – specifically, on new civil servant salaries and foreign investments to 21 firms – in a column, and its editor-in-chief Asa Bafaqih was put on trial. Bafaqih accepted full responsibility, while refusing to reveal the names of informants in accordance with the journalistic code. The investigation was eventually ceased by the Attorney General at that time, Soeprapto.

It ceased publication in 1958.

== Notable staff ==
- Saeroen, founder
- Oene Djoenaidi, owner
- Mohammad Tabrani, editor-in-chief
- Anwar Tjokroaminoto, deputy editor
- Soemanang Soerjowinoto, editor-in-chief, later Economic Minister
- Asa Bafaqih, editor-in-chief

== Bibliography ==
- Mark, Ethan (2018). Japan's Occupation of Java in the Second World War: A Transnational History. Bloomsbury Publishing. ISBN 978-1-350-02221-8.
