= Suardi Tasrif =

Indonesian writer (1922–1991)

- Born: 3 January 1922; Cimahi, Dutch East Indies
- Died: 24 April 1991 (aged 69); Jakarta, Indonesia
- Education: University of Indonesia
- Occupations: Journalist, advocate

Suardi Tasrif (3 January 1922 – 24 April 1991) was an Indonesian journalist, writer, and advocate. He became active in journalistic endeavors starting in the Indonesian National Revolution, and led the prominent newspaper Abadi during the Sukarno period since its founding in 1951 until its ban in 1960. He moved into advocacy during the New Order era, lobbying for legal reform in the Suharto regime's early years and becoming a prolific writer on legal and political matters. He has also contributed to the code of ethics of both the journalistic and advocacy professions in Indonesia.

== Early life and education ==
Tasrif was born on 3 January 1922 in Cimahi, today in West Java. He was the son of Mohammad Tasrif and Siti Hapzah, and was of a mixed Sundanese-Javanese heritage. After completing elementary school in 1936, he studied at a Meer Uitgebreid Lager Onderwijs in Palembang until 1939, then an Algemene Middelbare School until 1942. His studies revolved around law and politics, with Tasrif being inspired by Sukarno's 1930 trial and native defendants such as Iskaq Tjokrohadisurjo. Later, he would study law at the University of Indonesia between 1962 and 1965, obtaining a bachelor's degree.

== Career ==
=== Writing and journalism ===
Tasrif began writing literature in 1945, inspired by Usmar Ismail, and within five years he had produced several poems, short stories, and scripts for plays. After a foray into journalism, co-publishing the Soeara Indonesia magazine, he briefly joined the Voice of Free Indonesia radio at Bandung as a broadcaster during the Indonesian National Revolution. After moving to Yogyakarta, he also lead the Berita Indonesia newspaper, which had been established by the nascent Indonesian Army in September 1945, and helped Usmar Ismail manage the magazines Tentara and Arena.

In 1951, Tasrif became the chief editor of the Abadi newspaper, which was affiliated with the Masyumi party and began publication on 2 January of that year. He developed good relationships with other newspaper heads such as Mochtar Lubis (Indonesia Raya) and Rosihan Anwar (Pedoman), their papers generally adopting a similar political position in opposition to heavily nationalist publications such as Harian Rakjat or Suluh Indonesia. The three of them, along with B.M. Diah, were founding members of the Indonesian branch of the International Press Institute. Abadi was shut down in 1960, when Tasrif refused to sign a document which would require the newspaper to support the Sukarno government's policies. He had previously been a significant contributor to the Indonesian journalism code of ethics, published in 1954.

=== Advocacy ===
After obtaining his law degree in 1965, Tasrif established his own law firm, sharing an office with Iskaq. He became an active member of the Indonesian Advocates' Association (Peradin) - designing its emblem and helping author a code of ethics for Indonesian advocates. Early in the transition to the New Order, Tasrif along with other lawyers such as Yap Thiam Hien prominently featured in debates over reforms to the Indonesian legal system. Due to Tasrif's journalistic experience and connections, he became one of the most consistent and well-known writers on legal and political issues in various newspapers and magazines, including Kompas, Sinar Harapan, Tempo, and Indonesia Raya. Tasrif and Yap argued, with little success, for Indonesia's judicial system to transition to common law. Throughout the late 1960s, Tasrif continued his activities at Peradin, joining its board in 1968 and elected its secretary-general in 1969. He also made efforts to form regional and international connections for the association.

In 1970, the Indonesian Legal Aid Foundation (Lembaga Bantuan Hukum/LBH) was founded, after Tasrif and other Peradin advocates like Yap and Adnan Buyung Nasution successfully lobbied for it. He was one of the defense lawyers in the prosecutions following the Malari incident. The Indonesian Journalists Association (PWI) appointed him as chairman of the organization's honorary board in 1978, though he would lament the reduced independence of the journalists in PWI, who he perceived as becoming increasingly linked with the ruling Golkar party.

== Personal life ==
Tasrif married Ratna Hajari Singgih on 19 July 1949, and the couple has six children.

== Death and legacy ==
He died on 24 April 1991 in Jakarta, and was buried at the Jeruk Purut Public Cemetery in South Jakarta. He was posthumously awarded the Star of Mahaputra, 2nd class in 1994, and the Alliance of Independent Journalists annually awards the Suardi Tasrif Award for contributions to press freedom in Indonesia.
