= Yunan Nasution =

Indonesian journalist (1913–1996)

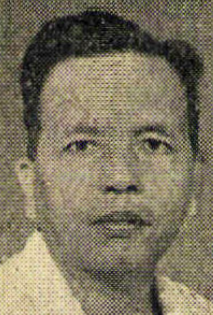
- Nasution, 1955

Member of the House of Representatives
- In office 17 February 1950 – 4 June 1960
- Constituency: RI (1950); Jakarta (1950–1960)

Personal details
- Born: 22 November 1913 Kotanopan, Tapanuli, Dutch East Indies
- Died: 29 November 1996 (aged 83) Jakarta, Indonesia
- Party: Masyumi

Mohammad Yunan Nasution (22 November 1913 – 29 November 1996) was an Indonesian journalist and politician of the Masyumi party. He served as a member of the House of Representatives from 1950 to 1960, in the Central Indonesian National Committee during the Indonesian National Revolution, and during the colonial period worked with Hamka in Medan. He was incarcerated as a political prisoner from 1962 to 1967 due to his involvement in Masyumi.

== Early life ==
Mohammad Yunan Nasution was born in the village of Botung in Kotanopan, in present-day Mandailing Natal Regency of North Sumatra, on 22 November 1913. His father, Khairullah (later known as "Haji Ibrahim" after completing a hajj) was a successful merchant who had founded a school in Botung. Nasution first studied at his father's school, then moved to a Hollandsch-Inlandsche School of Kotanopan. He also studied at the Parabek pesantren in West Sumatra. During his education, he joined the Sarekat Islam's scouting arm in Bukittinggi.

== Colonial journalist ==
By 1932, Nasution had begun to dabble in journalism, founding the Himalaya press bureau in Bukittinggi. Himalaya published reports of popular suffering under colonial rule, and by August 1933 Nasution had been arrested and imprisoned for four months. Upon his release, he was prohibited from staying in Bukittinggi, and had to move to Medan where he published the thrice-monthly Soeloeh Islam magazine. By late 1935, he had moved to the weekly magazine Pedoman Masjarakat where he worked with Hamka.

Under Hamka and Nasution, the magazine gained popularity with over 4,000 copies per issue and sales agents in Singapore and Penang. Pedoman Masjarakat ceased publication in February 1942 due to paper shortages caused by the Second World War. Nasution and Hamka soon established a new magazine, Semangat Islam, which due to the Japanese occupation of the Dutch East Indies avoided political issues and instead mostly wrote on Islamic matters. Nasution was chief editor of the magazine. This magazine remained in publication for around two years.

== Political career ==
Early in the Indonesian National Revolution, Nasution was appointed into the Indonesian National Party branch in East Sumatra as vice chairman, but left the party to found the Indonesian Muslims' Party (Parmusi) in November 1945. However, upon receiving news of the establishment of the national Masyumi Party, he immediately joined Parmusi into Masyumi, and became Masyumi's Sumatra chair. He also joined the Central Indonesian National Committee, and following the end of the revolution he became a member of the House of Representatives of the United States of Indonesia and later the Provisional House of Representatives. He retained his seat as a representative of Jakarta following the 1955 Indonesian legislative election. Aside from his career in government, he also co-founded the newspaper Abadi along with Suardi Tasrif.

By 1958, many leaders of Masyumi and the Indonesian Socialist Party (PSI) had gathered in Sumatra, preparing the competing Revolutionary Government of the Republic of Indonesia (PRRI). By this time, Nasution, who remained in Jakarta, became Masyumi's secretary-general, and along with vice-chairman Soekiman Wirjosandjojo issued a statement against anti-government armed violence. Nasution remained in Masyumi's leadership under Prawoto Mangkusasmito following its 1959 congress, until the party itself was dissolved in September 1960.

=== Imprisonment ===
On 16 January 1962, Nasution was arrested by military police officers and was incarcerated, initially in Jakarta before being moved to Madiun in December that year. He was imprisoned along with a number of other politicians from Masyumi and PSI such as former prime minister Sutan Sjahrir. Later during his imprisonment, Nasution was relocated to Jakarta, where he stayed until he was released on 17 May 1966 together with 14 other political prisoners. He remained restricted to Jakarta until his full legal status was restored on 19 May 1967. In his account, Nasution wrote about the Mawlid celebrations of 1962, when Hamka visited his detention center as the preacher for the occasion, around a year before Hamka's own incarceration.

== Later career ==
After his release, Nasution co-founded the Indonesian Islamic Propagation Council under the leadership of former prime minister Mohammad Natsir in 1967. He also joined the editorial board of Abadi, which had been re-established by Burhanuddin Harahap. He died in Jakarta on 29 November 1996.
