= List of literary works published in Asia Raya =

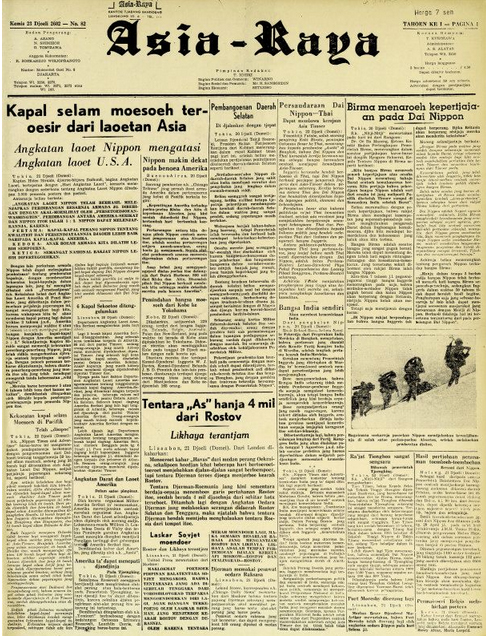
Front page of Asia Raya, 23 July 1942

A total of sixty-nine poems, sixty short stories, and three serials were published in Asia Raya, a newspaper in the Dutch East Indies and early Indonesia. First published on 29 April 1942, months after the Empire of Japan invaded the Indies, Asia Raya was established under the occupation government and intended as a vehicle for pro-Japanese propaganda – including literature. Run by both Japanese and native staff, the newspaper remained in publication until 7 September 1945, closing less than a month after Indonesia proclaimed its independence.

During the occupation, the Japanese overlords enacted censorship standards, which Asia Raya – as an organ of the occupying forces – followed strictly. Writers looking to have their works published were limited in themes they could select by the Institute for People's Education and Cultural Guidance (in Indonesian, Poesat Keboedajaan; in Japanese, Keimin Bunka Shidōsho (啓民文化指導所)) in the capital at Jakarta. They were told that works dealing with internal struggle or otherwise depressing topics would "poison" society with confusion and despair. Instead, writers hoping to be published had to focus on positive themes in an effort to instill positive traits in society; by the end of the occupation, this meant a nationalistic struggle. (Note: By the end of the occupation the Japanese had begun helping Indonesians prepare for their independence. This included, among other efforts, forming the Committee for Preparatory Work for Indonesian Independence for deliberations and assisting with the proclamation of Indonesian independence, which was drafted in the home of a Japanese admiral (Dahm 1971, pp. 100–111).) To subvert these policies, writers often hid more personal anti-colonial subtexts in their works.

Asia Raya's contributors were Japanese or native, with the latter more active; works by two foreign authors, Rabindranath Tagore and Mahatma Gandhi, were also published in translation. The single most-published writer in Asia Raya was Rosihan Anwar, a recent senior high school graduate, who published seven poems and nine short stories while working for the newspaper. Andjar Asmara, a former film director, published the most serials; both of his serials were based on films he had made before the occupation.

The following list is divided into three tables, one for poems, one for short stories, and one for serials; the tables are initially arranged alphabetically by title, although they are also sortable. Author's names are given as recorded in Asia Raya, with explanatory notes indicating pseudonyms where known. Titles are given in the original spelling, with a literal English translation underneath. Dates, originally in the Japanese kōki (皇紀) calendar, are given in the Gregorian calendar. Unless otherwise noted, this list is based on the one compiled by Mahayana (2007, pp. 209–215).

== Poems ==
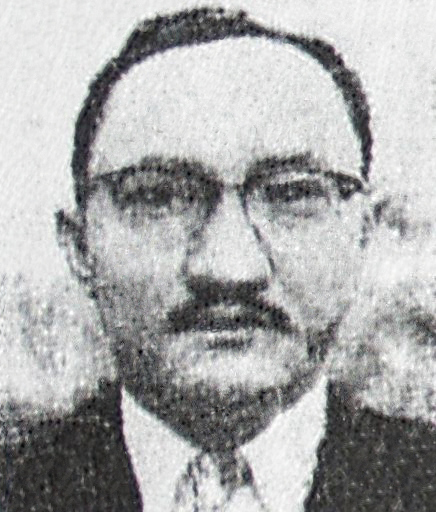
Usmar Ismail published several poems and short stories.

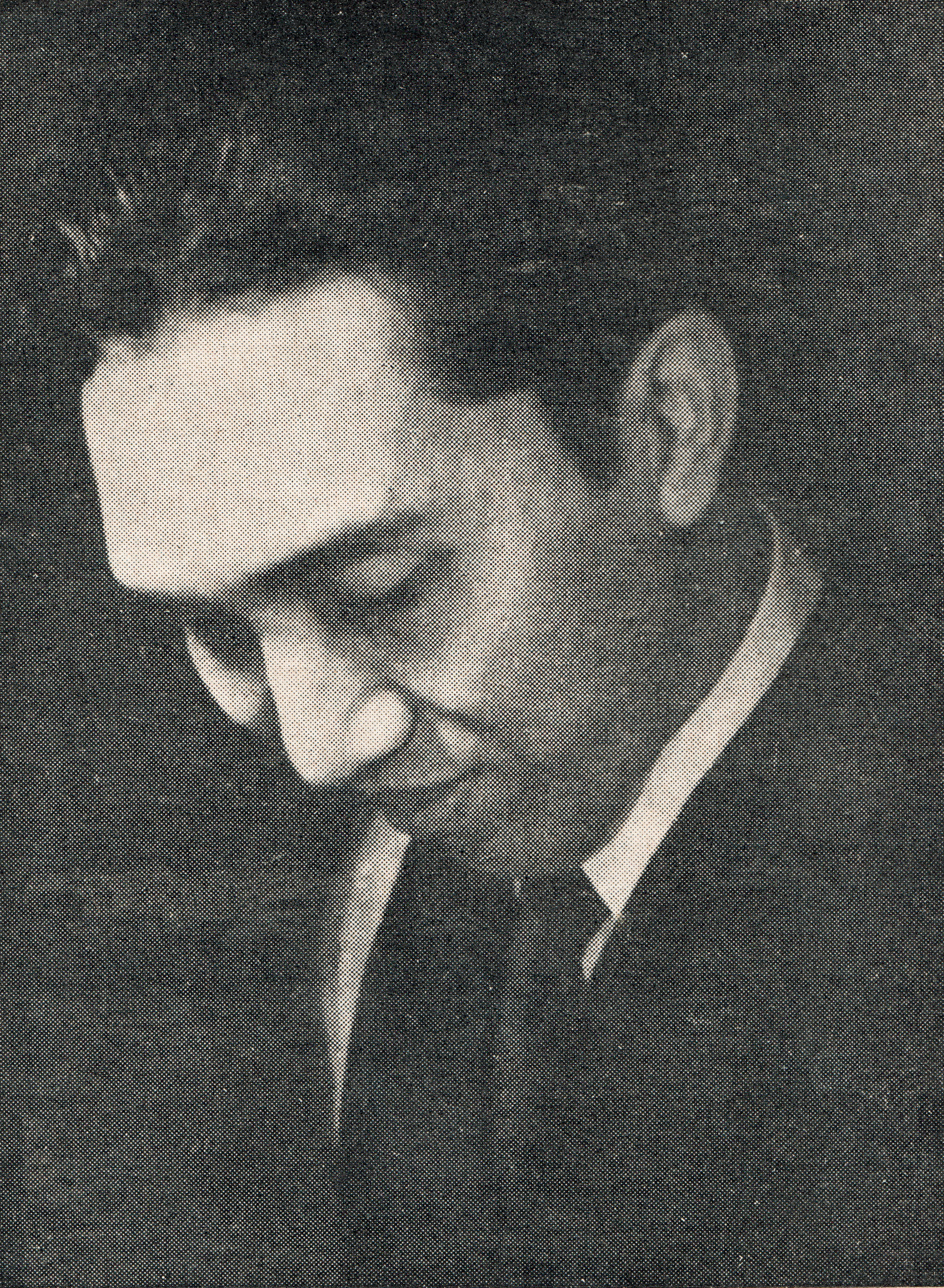
Multiple poems by Rosihan Anwar were published.

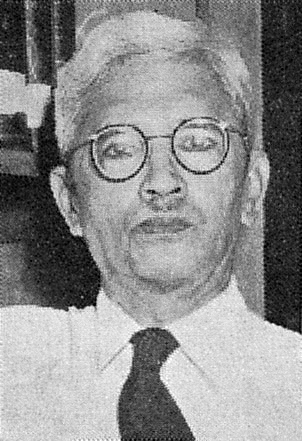
Noer Soetan Iskandar published a poem on fasting.

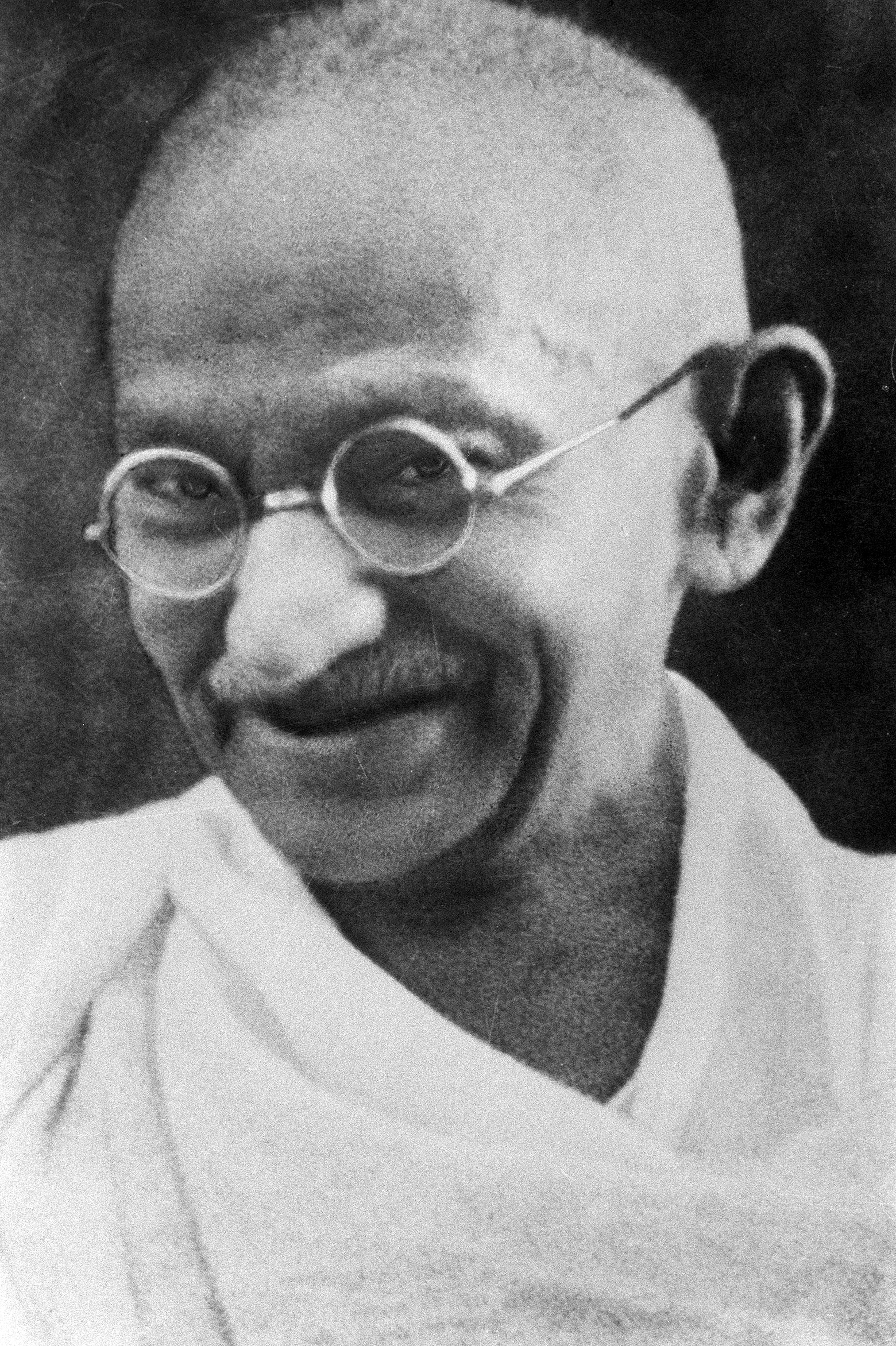
A poem by Mohandas Karamchand Gandhi was translated and published.

Poems published in Asia Raya
| Title | Date | Author | Note |
|---|---|---|---|
| "Al-Qoeran al-Karim" "The Quran of Karim" | 15 June 1945 | Hj. Aboebakar | |
| "Angin Foedji" "Winds of Fuji" | 3 July 1943 | Usmar Ismail | |
| "Angkatan Baroe" "New Period" | 22 May 1945 | Rosihan Anwar | |
| "Angkatankoe" "My Period" | 29 May 1945 | B.H. Loebis | |
| "Asia Raja" "Great Asia" | 21 May 1942 | St. P.B. | |
| "Banjak Arti Kilat Matamoe" "The Many Meanings in Your Eyes" | 2 June 1942 | Darmawidjaja | |
| "Bantoean Toean" "Lord's Help" | 6 September 1944 | Romoesha | |
| "Bermoekim di Moesim Bertanam di Zaman" "Living in the Seasons, Harvest in the Ages" | 31 May 1942 | St. P.B. | |
| "Boenglon" "Chameleon" | 26 November 1942 | Gegap Gempita | |
| "Dharma Pemoeda" "Youth's Religion" | 28 June 1945 | B. Rangkoeti | |
| "Diponegoro" | 8 February 1945 | Rosihan Anwar | |
| "Djangan Tak Goena" "Not Useless" | 11 June 1945 | Karim Halim | |
| "Djeritan Hidoep Baroe" "Cry of a New Life" | 5 April 1945 | Rosihan Anwar | |
| "Djeritan Malam" "Cry in the Night" | 10 July 1945 | Noersamsoe | |
| "Doa" "Prayer" | 17 February 1945 | B. Rangkoeti | |
| "Doa" "Prayer" | 6 July 1945 | B.H. Loebis | |
| "Doa" "Prayer" | 25 August 1945 | H.B. Jassin | |
| "Dokoritoe" "Independence" | 2 June 1945 | Takahashi Taisa | (Note: Title in Japanese) |
| "Fadjar Naik" "Dawn Rises" | 23 June 1945 | A. Soebyarto | |
| "Gita Negara" "Song of the State" | 27 February 1943 | M.S. Azhar | |
| "Hari Raja" "Holiday" | 30 September 1943 | Djoeffrie | |
| "Hasrat Angkatanku" "My Period's Needs" | 16 July 1945 | Afandi Ridhwan | |
| "Indahlah Noesa" "Beautiful Islands" | 10 June 1944 | Rosihan Anwar | |
| "Ingatlah" "Remember" | 1 January 1943 | Unknown | (Note: Taken from a calendar advertisement.) |
| "Kebesarannja" "His Greatness" | 23 August 1945 | Karim Halim | |
| "Kenangan Diponegoro" "Remembering Diponegoro" | 7 February 1945 | Ma'roef Anas | |
| "Kepada Toean" "To, Sir" | 28 June 1945 | Unknown | (Note: Credited to the Central Office of Independence War Funds) |
| "Kewadjiban" "Duty" | 21 August 1945 | H.B. Jassin | |
| "Kisah di Waktoe Pagi" "A Morning-time Story" | 1 April 1944 | Rosihan Anwar | |
| "Kodrat Waktoekoe" "Nature of My Time" | 8 July 1944 | Soetomo Djaoehar Arifin | |
| "Laoetan" "Ocean" | 21 June 1942 | Roestam Effendi | |
| "Lebah Sekawan" "Gang of Bees" | 23 January 1943 | Boedi Moerni | |
| "Loekisan" "Drawing" | 10 April 1944 | Rosihan Anwar | |
| "Menghadapi Moesoeh" "Facing the Enemy" | 25 July 1945 | Toha | |
| "Menoedjoe Tjita" "Towards Hope" | 18 July 1945 | S. Wakidjan | |
| "Minat Poetra Dewasa" "A Grown Boy's Wish" | 9 March 1943 | M.S. Azhar | |
| "Moesafir" "Wayfarer" | 29 March 1945 | Rosihan Anwar | |
| "Moesoeh Mendarat di Balikpapan" "Enemy Landing at Balikpapan" | 7 July 1945 | Takahashi Taisa | |
| "NamaMoe Toehan" "Your Name, God" | 13 July 1945 | Karim Halim | |
| "Njanjian dari Pendjara" "Songs from Prison" | 21 July 1943 | Mohandas Karamchand Gandhi | (Note: In translation) |
| "Pahlawankoe" "My Hero" | 21 July 1945 | Agni Wiratma | |
| "Pandai Besi" "Blacksmith" | 16 October 1943 | Noersamsoe | |
| "Pembangoenan Nippon Baroe" "Building a New Japan" | 11 February 1943 | Unknown | |
| "Pemoeda Kini Bergelora" "The Youth are Impassioned" | 24 July 1945 | A. Djaoehari | |
| "Pemoeda Perantara" "Youth in the Middle" | 2 June 1945 | Noersamsoe | |
| "Pemoeda Perdjuangan" "Youth in the Struggle" | 30 June 1945 | Takahashi Taisa | |
| "Pemoeda Zaman" "Youth of the Ages" | 23 May 1945 | Karim Halim | |
| "Pentjalang" | 12 June 1943 | M.S. Azhar | |
| "Perdjuangan Seriboe Djoeta Manoesia" "Struggle of a Thousand Million People" | 28 October 1943 | Hassan Noel Arifin | |
| "Permenoengan" "Reflection" | 17 May 1942 | Darmawidjaja | |
| "Poeasa" "Fasting" | 19 August 1944 | Noer Soetan Iskandar | |
| "Ratna Satria" "Ratna the Knight" | 5 June 1943 | B.H. Loebis | |
| "Renoengkan Sedjenak" "Contemplate for a Moment" | 23 June 1945 | El Hakim | (Note: Pseudonym of Abu Hanifah (Jassin 1993, p. 15)) |
| "Renoengkan Sedjenak" "Contemplate for a Moment" | 27 June 1945 | Hartono Andjasmara | |
| "Satoe Arti" "One Meaning" | 31 July 1945 | Suchitra | |
| "Sayat Sembiloe" "The Sayat Knife" | 21 November 1942 | Darmawidjaja | |
| "Sebelum Perdjoeangan" "Before the Struggle" | 19 June 1945 | Taslim Ali | |
| "Semangat Pemoeda" "Youth's Passion" | 12 June 1945 | Panyam Noer | |
| "Soeara Sedjarah" "Voice of History" | 14 July 1945 | Taslim A. | |
| "Soenting Melati" "Acquiring Jasmine" | 1 January 1943 | Gegap Gempita | |
| "Soerat Antjaman" "Threatening Letter" | 17 May 1942 | Cloboth | |
| "Tanah Airkoe" "My Homeland" | 8 July 1944 | Usmar Ismail | |
| "Tekad Boelad" "Determination" | 17 July 1945 | Wiwiek Hidajati | |
| "Tempat Pemoeda" "Place for Youth" | 7 November 1943 | Koesoema Endah | |
| "Terima Kasih Iboe" "Thank You Mother" | 22 December 1944 | H.R. | |
| "Tetap" "Stable" | 11 July 1945 | Unknown | |
| "Tinggalkan Dakoe di dalam Sunji" "Leave Me in Silence" | 16 May 1942 | Darmawidjaja | |
| "Tjiptakan Doenia Bahagia" "Create a Happy World" | 19 July 1945 | H.B. Jassin | |
| "WahjoeMoe Koedoes" "Your Sacred Revelation" | 20 July 1945 | Karim Halim | |

== Short stories ==
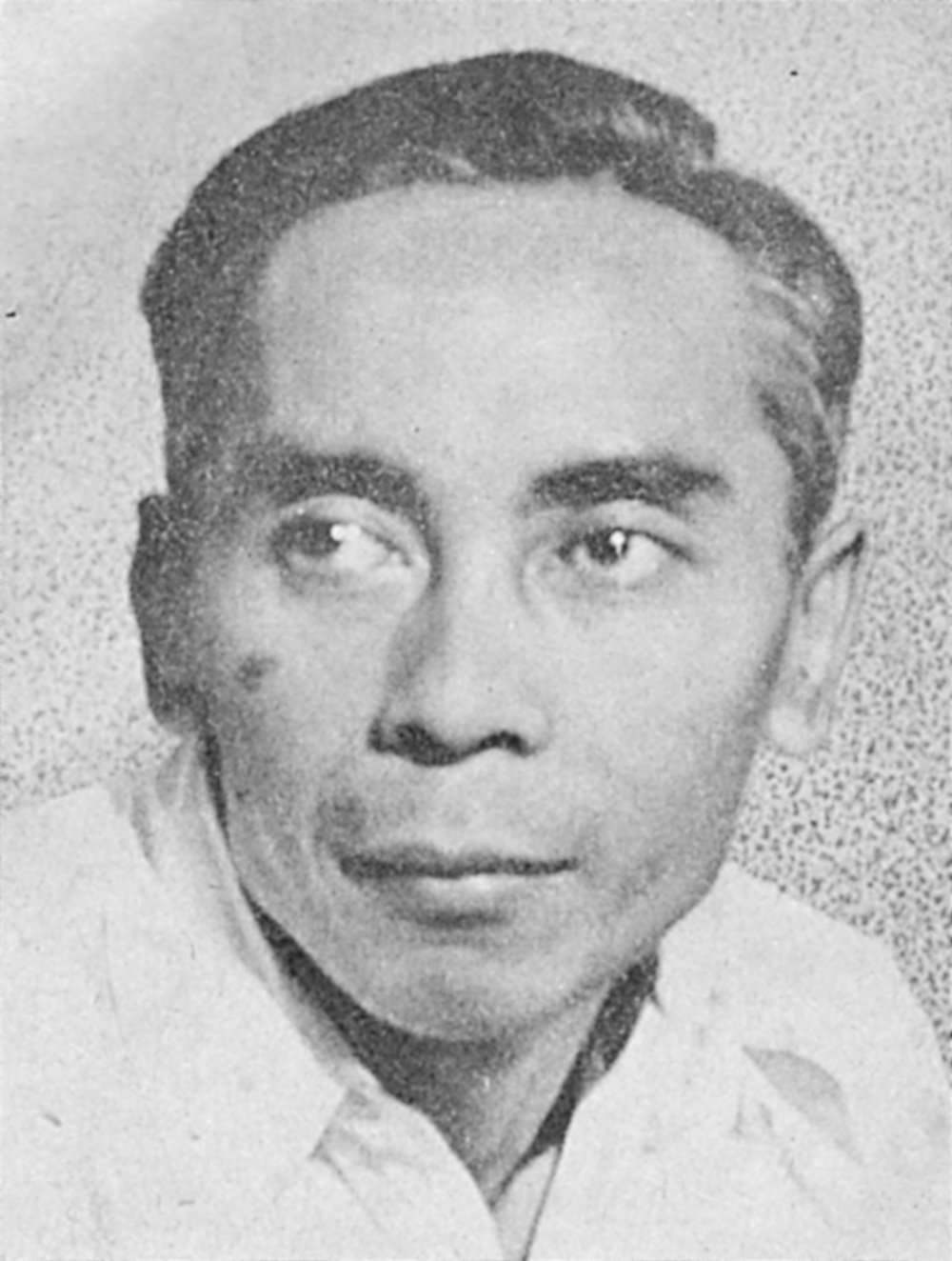
One short story by Achdiat Karta Mihardja was published.

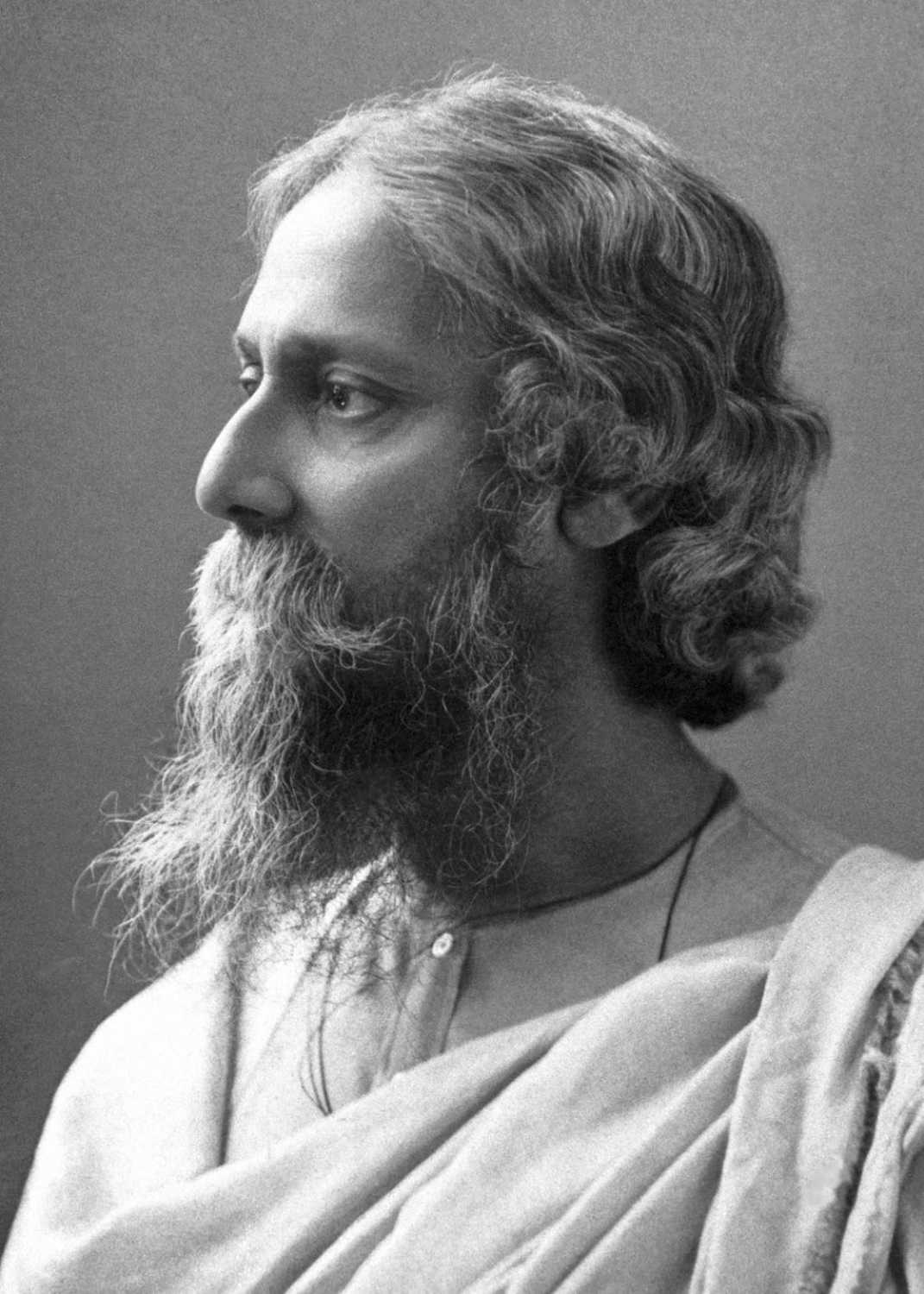
Two short stories by Rabindranath Tagore were translated and published.

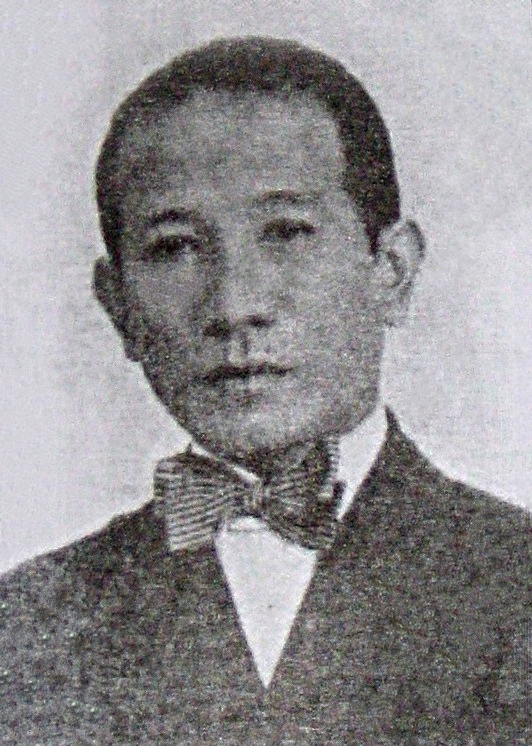
Andjar Asmara published three short stories and two serials.

Short stories published in Asia Raya
| Title | Date | Author | Note |
|---|---|---|---|
| "Aroes Mengalir" "The Flowing Current" | 15 July 1944 | Karim Halim | |
| "Batoe" "Stone" | 1 February 1944 | Tetsoekitji Kawai | (Note: Edited by Rosi Tani) |
| "Beladjar jang Penghabisan" "The Last Studies" | 14 January 1943 | Sastrosoewignjo | |
| "Bintang Koekoes" "Star of Steam" | 1 January 1943 | O.S. | (Note: A fairytale) |
| "Boekan Karena Akoe" "Not Because of Me" | 15 April 1944 | Aoh Kartahadimadja | |
| "Darah Laoet" "Blood of the Sea" | 1 July 1944 | H.B. Jassin | |
| "Dengan Dibimbing oleh Toehan" "With God's Guidance" | 25 July 1945 | Achdiat Karta Mihardja | |
| "Di dalam Mesdjid" "In the Mosque" | 1 June 1945 | Darsjaf Rachman | |
| "Di Moesim Panen" "In the Harvest Season" | Unknown | Cloboth | |
| "Di Tempat Asoehan Garoeda" "Where the Garuda is Kept" | 15 January 1944 | Hoemio Niwa | |
| "Dimana (Daidantjoo)" "Where is (Daidantjoo)" | 10 May 1945 | Rosihan Anwar | (Note: Title partially illegible (in parentheses)) |
| "Ditjari" "Sought" | 14 June 1942 | Andjar Asmara | (Note: Pseudonym of Abisin Abbas) |
| "Djawabnja" "The Answer" | 21 June 1942 | Zahar | |
| "Djiwa Pahlawan" "Soul of a Hero" | 1 June 1944 | Hodidjah Machtoem | |
| "Djoeroe Rawat" "Nurse" | 15 February 1945 | Poetra Zaman | |
| "Djoewariah" | 12 January 1945 | Rosihan Anwar | |
| "Djonggol Desa" "Village Representative" | 14 April 1945 | Rosihan Anwar | |
| "Doenia Tjopet" "World of Pickpockets" | 2 May 1942 | Abu Sulaiman | |
| "Dosa jang Tak Dapat Diampoeni" "Unforgivable Sin" | 21 June 1942 | A.A. | |
| "Dr. Soegianto" | 3 February 1945 | Rosihan Anwar | |
| "Gadis Berkoedoeng Perioek Kaju" "Girl Maimed by a Wooden Pot" | 9 October 1943 | S. Harutaro | |
| "Hoedjan dan Panas" "Rain and Heat" | 10 February 1945 | Noersamsoe | |
| "Indonesia Tanah Kekasih" "Indonesia, Land of Lovers" | 6 September 1945 | Usmar Ismail | |
| "Irama Masa" "Rhythm of the Times" | 27 January 1945 | Poetra Zaman | |
| "Isjarat Anai-Anai" "Signs of Termites" | 28 June 1945 | Soedjani | |
| "Kemedja Lama" "Old Shirt" | 14 July 1945 | Inoe Kertapati | |
| "Ketika KOKKI Moelai Berkibar di Djawa" "When KOKKI Flourishes in Java" | 23 February 1943 | Maru Furura | |
| "Kitjizo ke Medan Perang" "Kitjizo Goes to the Battlefield" | 1 January 1944 | Josikei Hino | (Note: Edited by Rosihan Anwar) |
| "Kjai Gondolajoe" | 16 June 1945 | Darmawidjaja | |
| "Korban Gadis" "Virginal Victim" | 1 April 1943 | Winarno | |
| "Lajar Poetih" "White Screen" | 1 April 1944 | Usmar Ismail | |
| "Laoet Perhoeboengan" "Connecting Seas" | 15 July 1944 | Unknown | |
| "Latihan Gerilja" "Guerrilla Training" | 26 May 1945 | Inoe Kertapati | |
| "Melangkah Teroes" "Keep Advancing" | 11 July 1945 | Unknown | |
| "Memoedja Majat Kekasih" "Worshipping a Lover's Corpse" | 8 May 1942 | Kamadjaja | |
| "Menjamboet Poeasa" "Welcoming the Fast" | 17 August 1944 | Rosihan Anwar | |
| "Mr. Doel" | 5 July 1942 | Andjar Asmara | |
| "Oentoek Saoedara" "For You" | 15 June 1943 | Rosihan Anwar | |
| "Pahlawan Moeda" "Young Hero" | 26 August 1944 | Rosihan Anwar | |
| "Pak Sewo" "Mr Sewo" | 24 April 1945 | Noersamsoe | |
| "Pak Tani Poelang" "The Farmer Returns" | 22 May 1943 | Unknown | |
| "Paman Koe" "My Uncle" | 15 June 1944 | Rosihan Anwar | |
| "Pandai Besi" "Blacksmith" | 1 September 1944 | D. Djojokoesoemo | |
| "Pemoeda Pantjaroba" "Youth in Transition" | 1 August 1944 | Soetomo Djaoehar Arifin | |
| "Perdjoeangan Batin" "Mind's Struggle" | 31 May 1942 | Tabrani Adris | |
| "Perhitoengan Njawa" "Counting Souls" | 9 May 1942 and 10 May 1942 | Hamid | (Note: In two instalments) |
| "Pertjintaan dan Pengorbanan" "Love and Sacrifice" | 4 September 1943 | S. Harutaro | |
| "Poetri Pertiwi" "Princess Pertiwi" | 24 May 1945 | Soetomo Djaoehar Arifin | |
| "Pradjoerit Nogikoe" "Soldier from Nogiku" | 5 February 1944 | Kan Kikotji | |
| "Ratapan" | 9 May 1942 and 10 May 1942 | Rabindranat Tagore | (Note: In two instalments, translation by Darmawidjaja) |
| "Resiko Goenting" "Problem with Scissors" | 12 May 1942 | Cloboth | |
| "Salah Sangka" "Mistaken" | 30 September 1943 | Katjamata | |
| "Seboeah Bingkisan" "A Package" | 1 February 1945 | Aoh Kartahadimadja | |
| "Seroean Azan" "Call of Adhan" | 17 May 1945 | Karim Halim | |
| "Si Amat Toekang Betjak" "Amat the Pedicab Driver" | 8 January 1943 and 9 January 1943 | M. Basri | |
| "Soeara jang Memberi Ilham" "Voice which Inspires" | 5 May 1942 | Andjar Asmara | |
| "Tamoe" "Guest" | 2 June 1942 | Rabindranat Tagore | (Note: Translation by Darmawidjaja) |
| "Tanda Bahagia" "Sign of Happiness" | 1 September 1944 | Bakri Siregar | |
| "Toentoenan" "Guidance" | 21 August 1945 | Darmawidjaja | |
| "Trem Berdjalan Teroes" "The Trem Treks On" | 12 June 1943 | Rosihan Anwar | |

== Serials ==
Serials published in Asia Raya
| Title | Date | Author | Note(s) |
|---|---|---|---|
| Kartinah | 30 April 1942 to 25 June 1942 | Andjar Asmara | |
| Noesa Penida | 30 June 1942 to 14 September 1942 | Andjar Asmara | |
| Roekmini | 21 January 1943 to 19 February 1943 | E.S.N. | |

== Works cited ==
- "Abisin Abbas". Filmindonesia.or.id (in Indonesian). Jakarta: Konfiden Foundation. Archived from the original on 19 February 2014.
- Dahm, Bernhard (1971). History of Indonesia in the Twentieth Century. Praeger. OCLC 230842.
- "In memoriam: Rosihan Anwar, the Last Mohican". The Jakarta Post. Jakarta. 14 April 2011. Archived from the original on 9 October 2012.
- Jassin, H.B. (1993). Kesusastraan Indonesia di Masa Jepang [Indonesian Literature in the Japanese Period]. Jakarta: Balai Pustaka. ISBN 978-979-407-307-0.
- Mahayana, Maman S. (2007). Ekstrinsikalitas Sastra Indonesia [Extrinsic Events in Indonesian Literature] (in Indonesian). Jakarta: RajaGrafindo Persada. ISBN 978-979-769-115-8.
