= Oene Djoenaidi =

Raden Haji Oene Djoenaidi
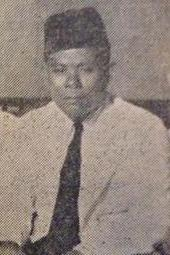
- Djoenaedi in 1943
- Born: 3 March 1895
- Died: 6 June 1966 (aged 71); Jakarta, Indonesia

Oene Djoenaidi (3 March 1895 – 6 June 1966), better known in Indonesia as R.H.O. Djoenaidi, was an Indonesian businessman. He sponsored the Pemandangan newspaper and was active in early Indonesian press.

== Early life ==
Djoenaidi was born on 3 March 1895. As a teenager, he studied Islam in Mecca, during which he became familiar with the Sarekat Islam (SI) and its leaders in Indonesia. By the age of 18, he had returned to Indonesia, to his home in Tasikmalaya, and joined the SI.

== Career ==
Once he returned, Djoenaidi worked to manage his father's coconut plantation, and traded in textiles around West Java. He expanded the agricultural business to lemongrass and rubber, and became known with the moniker "Lemongrass King". He also started a publisher, Galunggung, in Bandung. In 1933, during a business trip to Batavia, he met journalist Saeroen who stayed in a hostel run by Djoenaidi's son, and he agreed to invest in Saeroen's newspaper Pemandangan. Within Pemandangan, Djoenaidi invested a significant proportion of his personal wealth, appointed Mohammad Tabrani as chief editor when Saeroen left, and was noted to be generous in compensation to writers and employees. In 1940 Djoenaidi additionally raised funds through Pemandangan to repatriate Indonesians living in Mecca stranded by transport restrictions due to World War II.

During the Japanese occupation of the Dutch East Indies, Djoenaidi was made deputy chief editor of the Japan-backed Asia Raya newspaper. Following Indonesian independence, Djoenaidi along with others such as Adam Malik and Sumanang co-founded the National Press Company (Badan Usaha Penerbitan Nasional), and he became a member of its board of directors. Djoenaidi had significant connections with republican leaders during the Indonesian National Revolution, at one point being arrested by the Dutch due to "connection with terrorist activities".

He died on 6 June 1966 in his home in Jakarta, having been treated for cancer.
