= Satya Graha (journalist) =

Former Indonesian journalist (1931–2022)

- Born: 5 August 1931; Blitar, Dutch East Indies
- Died: 8 June 2022 (aged 90)
- Occupation(s): Journalist, translator

Satya Graha (also spelled Satyagraha; 5 August 1931 – 8 June 2022) was an Indonesian translator and journalist, mostly active during the Sukarno period in the 1950s and the 1960s with the Suluh Indonesia newspaper. Having worked at the newspaper since its founding, he served as its final chief editor before the newspaper's ban and his incarceration in 1965.

== Biography ==
Satya was born in Blitar on 5 August 1931. As a teenager during the Indonesian National Revolution, he joined Indonesian guerilla forces, mostly serving inside major general Moestopo's division within the military police and intelligence units. His journalistic career began in 1951, when he joined the Pesat magazine in Yogyakarta.

In 1953, Satya was one of the first journalists at the Suluh Indonesia newspaper, which was affiliated with the Indonesian National Party (PNI). According to Satya's accounts, the newspaper only had him, chief editor Sayuti Melik, and journalist Hasan Gayo when he joined. He became Suluh Indonesia's correspondent at the Indonesian presidential palace (due to Sukarno's familiarity with his parents), and he joined Sukarno's overseas trips. Despite his personal relations with Sukarno, he was briefly banned from covering at the palace when Suluh Indonesia published S. K. Trimurti's article criticizing Sukarno's fourth marriage. Despite Sukarno's complaints, Satya also defended Suluh Indonesia's publication of criticism against the Indonesian Communist Party (PKI).

After the 1955 Indonesian legislative election, Jusuf Muda Dalam became the newspaper's editor-in-chief, despite Satya's vocal opposition due to Dalam's association with communism. When Dalam was replaced in 1957 with Mohammad Isnaeni, Satya became the deputy editor-in-chief, and he initiated the Sunday magazine Berita Minggu. It became very popular, reaching a peak circulation of 350,000 and generating enough income to sustain the newspaper's continued publication. To further capitalize on the success of Berita Minggu, Satya required newspaper distributors to purchase Suluh Indonesia papers as part of a package with Berita Minggu, boosting its popularity. He was elected as secretary-general of the Indonesian Journalists Association in 1959, serving until 1965.

Between 1956 and 1965, Satya made three visits to the People's Republic of China. He wrote extensively of his visits, generally praising the Chinese government's programs such as the agricultural communes. He also drew contrasts between the apparent political unity within China with the unstable domestic political situation in Indonesia, and unfavorably compared Chinese Indonesians with the mainland Chinese.

In July 1965, during an internal conflict within PNI, Isnaeni fell out of favor and was removed from his chief editor post, with Satya appointed by party chairman Ali Sastroamidjojo to replace him. Following the 30 September movement several months later, Suluh Indonesia was banned by authorities and published its final edition on 2 October 1965. Satya was arrested on 18 October and imprisoned without trial in Salemba. While investigators determined that Satya was not affiliated with PKI, he was still held due to his closeness to Sukarno, and shared a prison block with writers and journalists such as Pramoedya Ananta Toer and Sitor Situmorang. He was released in late 1970, and afterwards worked at a company owned by Taufiq Kiemas as a translator since he was banned from returning to journalism. He then lived in Bekasi, and still worked as a translator. He died on 8 June 2022.
