= Asa Bafaqih =

Indonesian journalist, diplomat, and politician

- Born: 14 December 1918; Batavia, Dutch East Indies
- Died: 11 December 1978 (aged 59); Surakarta, Central Java, Indonesia

Asa Bafaqih (14 December 1918 – 11 December 1978) was an Indonesian journalist, diplomat, and politician. He was best known for being editor-in-chief of the Antara news agency and the Pemandangan newspaper. He also served as ambassador of Indonesia to Sri Lanka and Algeria.

== Early life ==
Bafaqih was born in Tanah Abang, Batavia (now Jakarta), on 14 December 1918. He studied at the Jamiat Kheir Islamic private institution.

== Career ==
Initially working as a religious studies teacher, Bafaqih began his journalistic career by translating Arabic articles to Malay for the daily newspaper Pemandangan. He also became a freelance writer for both Pemandangan and the weekly magazine Pandji. After Pemandangan was censured by the Dutch authorities, Bafaqih moved to the Japanese Dōmei news agency to work as an editor. He was still an editor by the time of the proclamation of Indonesian independence. Several hours before the event itself, fellow journalist Adam Malik contacted Bafaqih with a text of the proclamation, and Bafaqih passed it over for a colleague to transmit across the archipelago, without being discovered by Japanese censors. After Indonesian independence, the Dōmei branch became Antara, and Bafaqih worked there as editor-in-chief. He ran the Jakarta office of the agency when its headquarters moved to Yogyakarta in 1946, alongside Mochtar Lubis. Antara was closed for some time after Operation Kraai in 1948, during which Bafaqih worked at the nationalist newspaper Merdeka.

On 18 March 1953, Pemandangan, under Bafaqih as editor-in-chief, published an editorial that indicated a number of companies had received information regarding foreign investments. Bafaqih was then charged for leaking state secrets and was put on trial. Under journalism ethics, Bafaqih refused to disclose his informant and instead accepted full responsibility. Other journalists, organized by his former coworker at Antara Mochtar Lubis, held a demonstration that drew some 1,000 journalists and supporters, along with a fire-brigade band to stir up the crowd. Eventually, Attorney General Soeprapto dropped the charges, citing a lack of clarity on "state secrets".

Bafaqih later became a member of the People's Representative Council of Mutual Assistance (DPR-GR) representing both journalists and the Nahdlatul Ulama. He was appointed as Indonesian ambassador to Sri Lanka, where he worked for four years between 1960 and 1964. He then was assigned as ambassador to Algeria for a year afterwards. During 1956, a series of writings by Bafaqih was published in a Tokyo magazine, in which he recounted a visit to the People's Republic of China in October 1954 and noted the persecution of Muslims in China. He also published a book based on that visit, titled RRT dari Luar dan Dalam (People's Republic of China from Outside and Inside).

He died in Surakarta, Central Java, on 11 December 1978 during a journalistic assignment.

== Bibliography ==
- Hill, David T. (2010). Journalism and Politics in Indonesia: A Critical Biography of Mochtar Lubis (1922-2004) as Editor and Author. Routledge. ISBN 978-1-135-16914-5.
