= Imam Syafei =

Lieutenant Colonel Imam Syafei
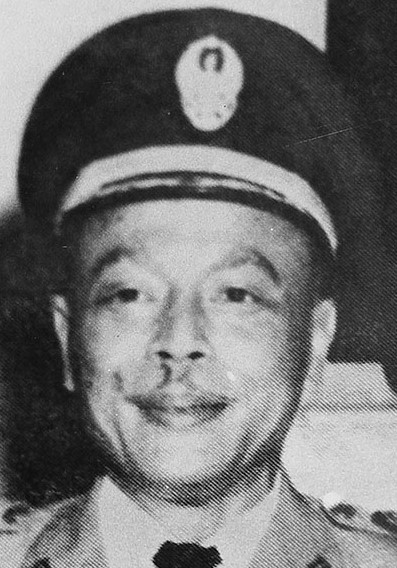
- Imam Syafei in 1966

Special Minister of Security
- In office 24 February 1966 – 20 March 1966
- President: Sukarno

Member of Mutual Assistance House of Representatives
- In office 15 August 1960 – ?
- President: Sukarno

Personal details
- Born: 27 September 1918 Batavia, Dutch East Indies
- Died: 9 September 1982 (aged 63) Jakarta, Indonesia

Military service
- Allegiance: Indonesia
- Branch: Indonesian Army
- Service years: 1945–1966
- Rank: Lieutenant Colonel
- Conflicts: Indonesian National Revolution; Madiun Affair

Lieutenant Colonel Imam Syafei (27 September 1918 – 9 September 1982), often spelled Imam Sjafe'i, Imam Sapi'ie, Imam Syafi'ie, Imam Sjafei, and popularly known as Bang Pi'ie, was a Betawi military figure and former Special Minister of Security in the Dwikora II Cabinet. Syafei earned the nickname Robin Hood of Senen. When he was a military officer, he was close to Abdul Haris Nasution.

Syafei, who became an orphan when he was four years old, was the son of a strongman. Following the death of his parents, he was taken care of by a cleric and then by his aunt. While living with his aunt, he began to form a group consisting of his own age, and later he was imprisoned. After being released from prison, Syafei studied martial arts and applied it to become a strongman at Senen Market.

During the Indonesian National Revolution, Syafei fought against the Dutch and was also involved in quelling the PKI Rebellion in Madiun. After the transfer of sovereignty, he was placed in the Greater Djakarta City Military Command with the rank of captain. As a member of the TNI, he founded the Cobra to accommodate his colleagues who were expelled from army service because they were illiterate. In 1958, he was promoted to lieutenant colonel.

Soekarno appointed Syafei as a member of the DPR-GR on 15 August 1960 and then served as Special Minister of Security until 20 March 1966. Then, he was imprisoned along with 14 ministers and was only released in 1975. He died on 9 September 1982.

== Biography ==
=== Early life and career ===
Syafei was born in the Bangka, Batavia on 27 September 1918. His father, Mugeni, was a strongman in the Senen Market. When he was 4 years old, he became an orphan after his father was stabbed to death with a machete when he wanted to control Senen Market. After his father's death, he was taken care of by a prominent cleric named Habib Qodir Al-Hadad. While under Habib Qodir's guidance, he learned religion and self-defense.

Syafei then lived with his aunt, Zaenab, who worked as a trader at Senen Market. He also started to form a gang whose members consisted of children his age. In the gang, he assigned them to collect rice and vegetables at Senen Market, which would later be given to his mother and two younger siblings for food. His action was considered an act of theft, so he was put in a children's prison in Tangerang. While in prison, he managed to defeat the prison strongman in a fight that lasted several minutes. From there, he became a prominent figure in prison. Later, he was released and returned to Pasar Senen.

When he was 16 years old, Syafei travelled to various places, even Kalimantan, to learn martial arts from several teachers. He also studied at the Tebuireng Islamic Boarding School for three years under the guidance of K.H Hasyim Asy'ari. After studying martial arts, he returned to Senen Market. With the martial arts skills he acquired, Syafei managed to defeat Pasar Senen strongman Muhayar. By defeating Muhayar, he was declared the strongman of Pasar Senen.

As a Senen Market strongman, he founded an organization called Kumpulan 4 Sen. In this gang, he ordered vegetable traders, hawkers, street vendors, and construction workers to collect fees of 4 cents guilders from market thugs so that they would not cause trouble. Local people called these troops the Sebenggol Troops.

=== Military career ===
==== National Revolution (1945–49) ====
With the arrival of allied troops and NICA in Jakarta in September 1945, Syafei joined a militia named Oesaha Pemoeda Indonesia (OPI) after being invited by Abdul Rachman Zakir and Daan Anwar and was appointed as commander. As commander, he mobilized youth, students, former Heiho and police, and pickpockets to expel allied forces and NICA from Jakarta. Apart from that, he played a role in mobilizing the masses to attend the Ikada Meeting. He also led resistance against NICA and British troops in the Tanah Tinggi.

On 11 October 1945, Syafei led the OPI resistance against Allied forces operating in the Senen Market area even though he was ill. Nevertheless, his troops managed to defeat the Allied forces. In the ensuing battle, he was captured by NICA troops but managed to escape from the prisoner's van. During the battle, he was always in the front row.

After escaping, Syafei and his troops continued to fight the Dutch. Then, he established his headquarters in Kampung Rawa, Gang Sentiong, and Utan Panjang. Then he joined the Laskar Rakyat Djakarta Raya (LRDR). On November 22, 1945, he was appointed as battle commander for the Jakarta area. In the battle against the Allied army, he formed an alliance with Haji Darip, K.H Noer Alie, and Mat Depok. On an unknown date, he and his troops moved to Karawang after Sutan Sjahrir ordered the fighters to vacate Jakarta because diplomacy would be carried out between Indonesia and the Allies. Even so, he vowed to return to Jakarta.

While based in Karawang, Syafei was appointed Deputy Chairman of the Central Combat Headquarters. In February 1946, there was a rebellion in the Karawang area led by Pa' Gelung, and Syafei and his troops succeeded in crushing the rebellion. He and his troops left the LRDR in April 1946 because they disagreed with its radical stance.

The LRDR unit led by Syafei later became the special forces of Division II Sunan Gunung Jati, then became the unit of Regiment V Brigade III Kiansantang Division I Battalion Siliwangi. He was also involved in the operation to suppress the 1948 PKI Rebellion in Madiun. Thanks to his involvement, he earned the rank of major.

==== After the transfer of sovereignty ====
After the transfer of sovereignty, Syafei joined the Greater Djakarta City Military Command even though he was illiterate and his rank was reduced to captain. However, many of his colleagues were demobilized from TNI service because they were illiterate. Therefore, he founded an organization called Corps Bambung Runcing (Cobra) to accommodate his colleagues who were expelled from the military and control bandits in the Jakarta area, especially in Senen Market.

As a leader of the Cobra, Syafei issued various policies for its members. For members who committed crimes but did not have money, Syafei provided them with business capital. However, if Cobra members perpetrated a crime even though they had received business capital, he punished them with a whip made from stingray tails. The Cobra organization was disbanded in 1959 at the request of the Jakarta military command.

Taking advantage of his work at the Greater Djakarta City Military Command, Syafei organized a crowd to attend the 17 October 1952 demonstration. In 1958, he graduated from the Army Command and Staff College and was promoted to the rank of lieutenant colonel. He was offered the position of commander of Sukarno's bodyguard, Cakrabirawa. However, he rejected the offer. On 15 August 1960, he was appointed as a member of the DPR-GR. As a member of the DPR, he became a member of the DPR-GR Household Affairs Agency on 17 November 1960. A year later, he became an administrator of the Greater Jakarta National Front.

=== Special Minister of Security ===
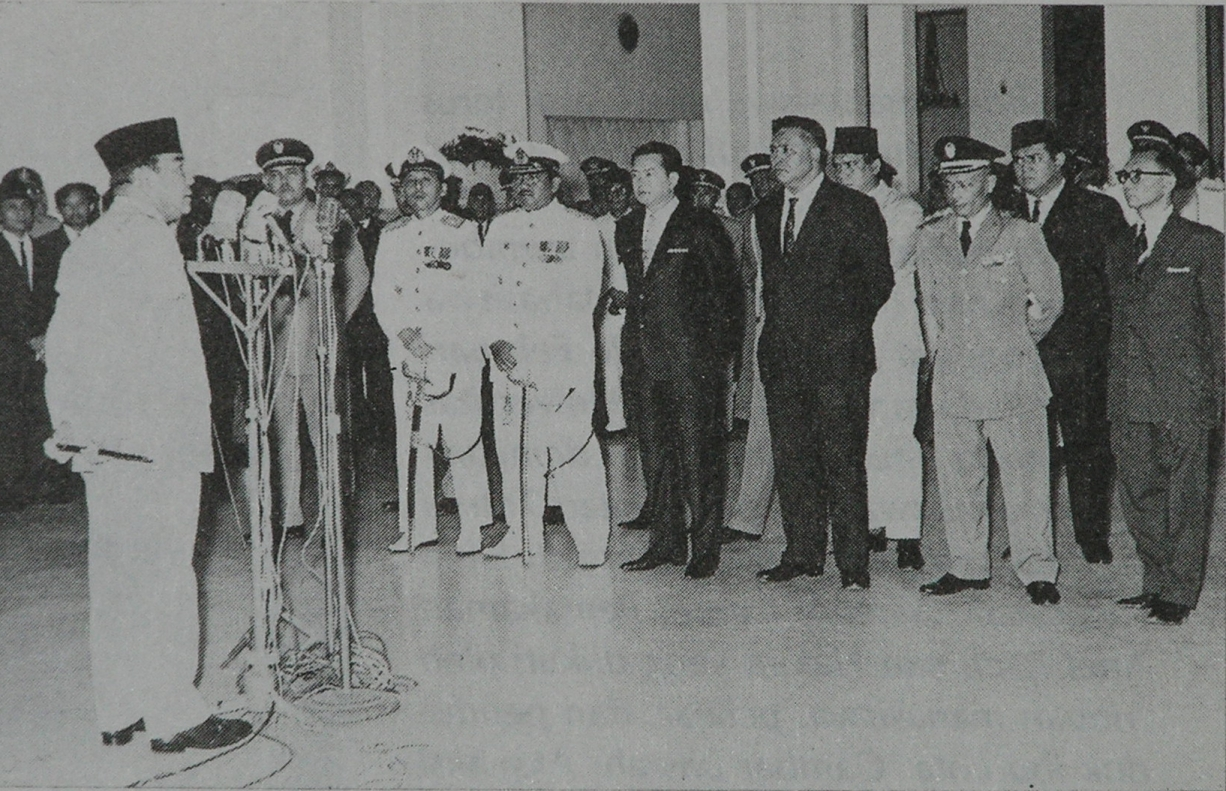
Inauguration of the Dwikora II Cabinet

His great influence in Jakarta and his expertise in controlling bandit movements made Soekarno appoint Syafei as Special Minister of Security on 24 February 1966. He was expected to be able to quell the student demonstrations, which were occurring every day.

Syafei's appointment as minister sparked controversy among student demonstrators. They accused Syafei of using his subordinates and influence in the Jakarta underworld to suppress the demonstration. His existence made the Dwikora II Cabinet nicknamed the Criminal Cabinet. Apart from that, he also earned the nickname pickpocket minister. He served as minister until 20 March 1966.

=== Became a prisoner ===
After Supersemar was signed, Suharto issued arrest warrants for 15 ministers, including Syafei, (Note: 14 other ministers include Minister of Central Banking Affairs Jusuf Muda Dalam, Minister of People's Irrigation and Village Development Ir. Surachman, State Minister Oei Tjoe Tat, Minister of Basic Education and Culture Sumardjo, Minister of Electricity and Energy Ir. Setiadi Reksoprodjo, Vice Prime Minister III Chaerul Saleh, Vice Prime Minister I dr. Soebandrio, Minister of Mining Armunanto, Minister of Manpower Soetomo Martopradoto, Minister of Justice Astrawinata, Minister of Information Major general Achmadi, Minister of Transmigration and Cooperatives Drs. Achadi, Minister of Home Affairs/Governor of Jakarta, Maj. Gen TNI Dr. Soemarno Sosroatmodjo dan Secretary General of the National Front JK Tumakaka.) on 18 March 1966 under the accusation of being involved in the communist movement. He was arrested on 20 March and detained in the athlete housing complex in Senayan. On 18 April 1966, he and 14 other ministers were transferred to the Military Detention Center (RTM) Jl Budi Utomo. While detained in RTM, he was known as a muezzin.

Then, Syafei and four other former ministers were transferred to the Nirbaya Rehabilitation Installation (Inrehab) in Lubang Buaya on 29 June 1966. While at the Nirbaya Inrehab, he lived in the same cell with Oei Tjoe Tat and was respected by the prison inmates. He was also close friends with Omar Dhani. The prison guard also obeyed him because of his status as a strongman of Senen. In 1975, he was released from jail.

== Late life ==
After being released from detention, Kostrad offered Syafei two jobs: returning to the military service with the guarantee of a promotion or becoming an ambassador. However, he refused the offer and preferred to spend his retirement at home.

Syafei died on 9 September 1982 at Jalan Wijaya 9, Kebayoran Baru, South Jakarta, and was buried at the Kalibata Heroes' Cemetery. To commemorate his service, Syafei was used as the name of a street in the Senen Market area. Previously, the road was called Jalan Senen Raya.

== Personal life ==
Syafei reportedly had five wives, one of which was Ellya Rosa and had 16 children. He was also close to the clerics in Kwitang and attended Quran recitations every Sunday morning at the Kwitang Taklim Council.

== Bibliography ==
- Fauzi, Muhammad (2010). Jagoan Jakarta dan Penguasaan di Perkotaan, 1950–1966 (Master thesis). Universitas Indonesia.
