= Abadi (newspaper) =

Defunct Indonesian newspaper

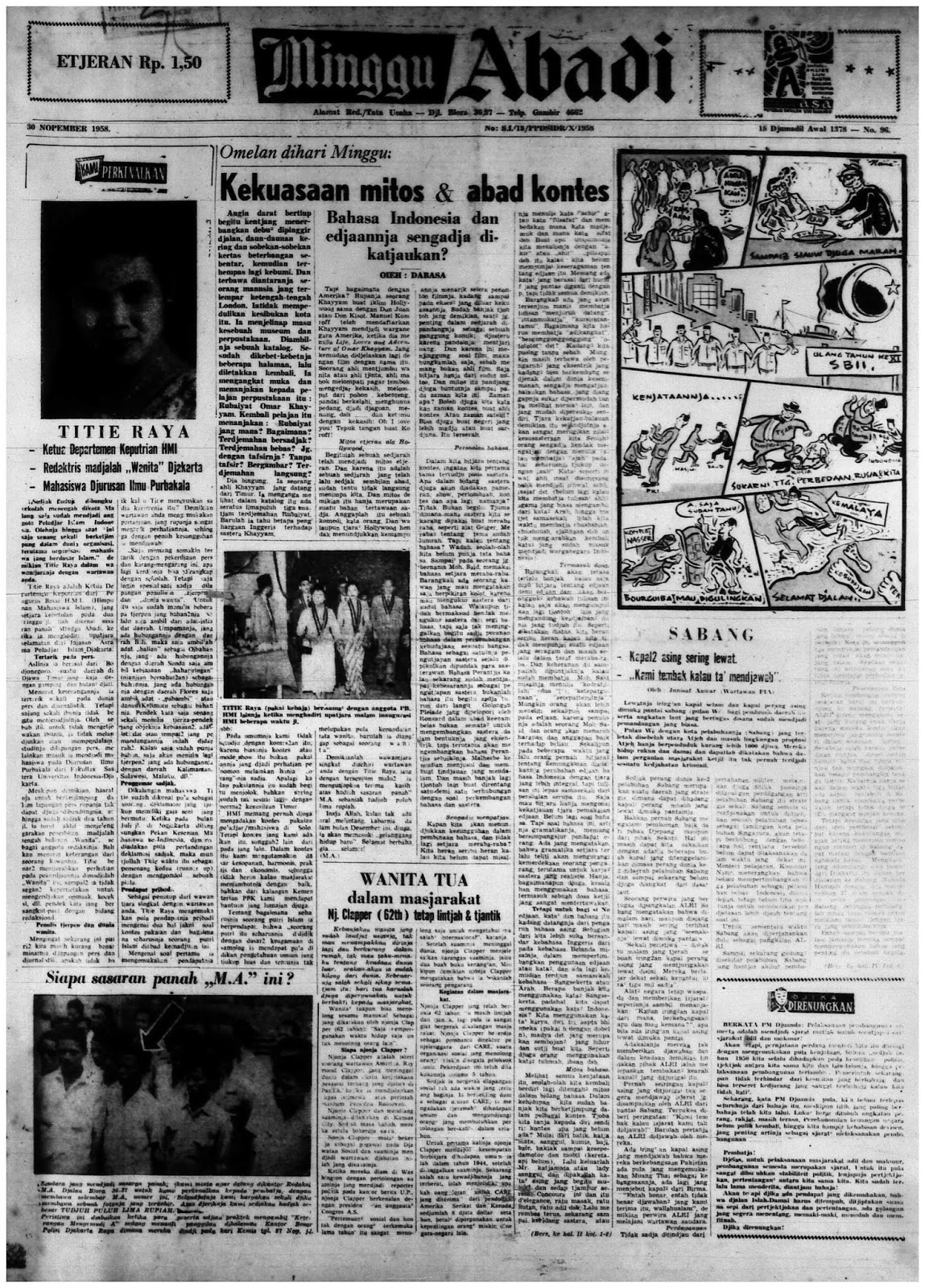
- Front page of Abadi's Sunday edition, 30 November 1958
- Type: Daily newspaper
- Format: Broadsheet
- Affiliation: Masyumi Party
- Founded: 2 January 1951
- Ceased publication: 1960–1968, 1974
- Language: Indonesian
- Headquarters: Jakarta
- Country: Indonesia

Abadi ('Eternal') was a daily Indonesian language newspaper based in Jakarta, which was published between 1951–1960 and 1968–1974. The newspaper was affiliated with the Masyumi political party, and was one of the largest newspapers in the Sukarno period until its ban in 1960. After the fall of Sukarno, it resumed publication in 1968 until its second ban in 1974 following the Malari incident during the dictator Suharto period.

== History ==
The newspaper began publication on 2 January 1951, initially led by Suardi Tasrif and printed in Jakarta. It was founded as the party newspaper of Masyumi, with a motto of "for religion, nation and country". Being a politically affiliated newspaper, Abadi would often become hostile to the sitting government when Masyumi was in the opposition - and as a result, during one such period, in 1953, the distribution of Abadi in prisons was banned.

During the mid-1950s, Abadi had a daily circulation of around 34,000, behind the Indonesian National Party's Suluh Indonesia, the Indonesian Communist Party's Harian Rakjat, and the Socialist Party of Indonesia's Pedoman. Although owned by an Islamic party, Abadi generally did not censor publications or advertisements deemed "morally inappropriate" such as scantily clad women in soap advertisements or the results of government lotteries. It was distributed nationally, with agents in various cities in Java, Sumatra and Bali.

As Masyumi's political standing deteriorated in the country, Abadi became critical of Sukarno's "Guided Democracy". In September 1957, the newspaper was banned for circulating for one day, as it did not use official statements when reporting on a growing dissent movement. It eventually ceased publication in 1960, when the government required press outlets to agree to a 19-point document requiring media outlets to support government policies. Tasrif, unwilling to do so, opted to shut down the newspaper, with its final publication on 31 October 1960.

=== New Order ===
The newspaper was revived in 1968 by former prime minister Burhanuddin Harahap, initially publishing six days a week excluding Sundays. Its first reestablished edition was printed on 7 December 1968. By 1970, Abadi had regained some of its former popularity, being one of the top ten newspapers in the country with a daily circulation of 20,000, and in August that year it began republishing Sunday editions. Its second and final ban happened in the aftermath of the 1974 Malari incident, following which the New Order government blamed media reporting for the chaos. Many newspapers lost their publication permits, including Abadi which lost it for good on 21 January 1974.

== People ==
- Suardi Tasrif, chief editor (1951–1960)
- Burhanuddin Harahap, chief editor (around 1968)
- Soemarso Soemarsono, chief editor (by 1974)
- Yunan Nasution, editorial staff (1968–1974)
