= A. M. Sipahoetar =

- Born: Albert Manoempak Sipahoetar; 26 August 1914; Taroetoeng, Dutch East Indies
- Died: 5 January 1948 (aged 33); Pakem, Yogyakarta, Indonesia
- Occupations: Journalist, writer
- Years active: 1932–1942

Albert Manoempak Sipahoetar (Note: Perfected Spelling Albert Manumpak Sipahutar. Some sources incorrectly give his last name as Sipanhoentar or Sipanhuntar) (26 August 1914 – 5 January 1948) was an Indonesian journalist and one of the founders of the state news agency Antara. Born in Tarutung, Dutch East Indies, he took up journalism at an early age and by age 20 had led two publications. After a time working in Medan, he went to the capital at Batavia (now Jakarta) with Adam Malik. After dabbling in politics and advertising, he established Antara together with three other reporters, heading the agency for a year between 1938 and 1939. Although he remained active as a reporter after leaving the agency, his health failed quickly and he died in a sanatorium near Yogyakarta.

== Early life and career ==
Sipahoetar, an ethnic Batak, was born in Tarutung, Tapanuli, Dutch East Indies (now Indonesia) on 26 August 1914. A nationalist, he took up an interest in journalism while young. Together with his friend Adam Malik he established a branch of the Indonesian Party (Partindo) in Pematang Siantar around 1932; during this time he also established the short-lived magazine Sinar Marhaen and led the daily Zaman Kita together with Arif Lubis.

Both publications had folded by 1934, and Sipahoetar became a correspondent with the Medan-based Pewarta Deli. He soon grew dissatisfied with this position and followed Malik to Batavia (now Jakarta), the colony's capital. There he became involved with the underground nationalist movement; one of its leaders, Djohan Sjahroezah, found him a job at a Dutch-owned advertiser named Arta.

== Antara ==
While with Arta, Sipahoetar also wrote for various local publications, covering politics and crime. This included Tjaja Timoer, under Soemanang Soerjowinoto. Soemanang, pleased by Sipahoetar's writing, invited him to collaborate. Both were dissatisfied as the existing Indies' news agency, Aneta, gave little space to local news. After several months of preparations, their new agency Antara was formally established on 13 December 1937.

Soemanang, as the senior reporter, was made editor-in-chief, while Sipahoetar became a senior editor; Malik also joined the agency as a senior editor. After Soemanang left the agency in 1938, Sipahoetar was elevated to managing editor. Meanwhile, he left Partindo to join the anti-fascist Indonesian People's Movement (Gerindo) under Amir Sjarifuddin. The movement helped him establish a new magazine, Toedjoean Rakjat, in 1938.

Around 1939 Sipahoetar fell ill with a lung disease and he returned to Sumatra to rest. He was briefly replaced as managing editor of Antara by Alwi Soetan Osman, an employee of the Indies' Ministry of Justice, before long-time Antara employee Pandoe Kartawigoena took up the position.

== Later life ==
Sipahoetar returned to Batavia after he felt healthy again, although he remained in poor physical condition. He remained politically active and continued writing for various publications, including the Chinese-owned newspaper Keng Po and the Indonesian-backed Kebangoenan. For his political activities the Dutch government arrested Sipahoetar. He was imprisoned first in Sukabumi, then in Garut and Nusakambangan.

After the Japanese occupied the Indies in early 1942, Sipahoetar and his fellow political prisoners were freed and returned to Batavia to reopen Antara. However, the occupation government wanted the agency liquidated. Ultimately the company was renamed Yashima on 29 May and absorbed into the Dōmei Tsushin news agency three months later. After his return he wrote a short biography of the nationalists Sukarno, Mohammad Hatta, and Sartono. The book, titled Siapa?: Loekisan tentang Pemimpin2 (Who?: Pictures of Leaders), is credited by the Indonesian journalist Soebagijo I.N. as the first biography written in Indonesian.

Sipahoetar left Domei soon afterwards because his lung disease had resurfaced. He went to Sukabumi to recuperate. There he married his nurse, Jetraningrat Kartadiwiria, in 1947. By May of that year he and his family had left for Yogyakarta, first going by train from Sukabumi to Jakarta, then joining Hamengkubuwono IX on a trip to the new capital. Sipahoetar spent the remainder of his life at a sanatorium in Pakem, north of the city, where he died on 5 January 1948.

Sipahoetar was interred in Yogyakarta in a ceremony that was attended by numerous political figures, including Sjarifuddin – by then prime minister. In 1978 his body was exhumed and moved to Tanah Kusir Cemetery in Jakarta; the reinterment was attended by government ministers Ismail Saleh and Malik.

== Works cited ==
- Cribb, Robert; Kahin, Audrey (2004). Historical Dictionary of Indonesia. Historical Dictionaries of Asia, Oceania, and the Middle East (2nd ed.). Lanham: Scarecrow Press. ISBN 978-0-8108-4935-8.
- I.N., Soebagijo (1981). Jagat Wartawan Indonesia [Universe of Indonesian Journalists] (in Indonesian). Jakarta: Gunung Agung. OCLC 7654542.
- van Klinken, Geert Arend (2003). Minorities, Modernity and the Emerging Nation: Christians in Indonesia, a Biographical Approach. Leiden: KITLV Press. ISBN 978-90-6718-151-8.
- McVey, Ruth (April 1985). "In Memoriam: Adam Malik (1917–1984)". Indonesia. 39. Ithaca: Cornell University Southeast Asia Program: 145–148. ISSN 0019-7289.
- Setiawanto, Budi (17 August 2008). "Perjuangan di Balik Keberadaan Antara" [The Struggle Behind the Presence of Antara] (in Indonesian). Antara. Archived from the original on 22 August 2008.
