= Hasan Gayo =

Indonesian politician and journalist (1923–1993)

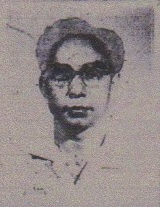
- Gayo, c. 1963
- Born: Muhammad Hasan Gayo; 1923; Lukup, Gouvernment of Atjeh and Dependencies, Dutch East Indies
- Died: 26 January 1993 (aged 69–70); Jakarta, Indonesia

Muhammad Hasan Gayo (1923 – 26 January 1993) was an Indonesian politician and journalist from Aceh. He was active in youth guerilla groups during the Indonesian National Revolution, and later worked as a journalist during the Sukarno period.

== Early life and education ==
Gayo originated from the village of Lukup, today in Pegasing district of Central Aceh Regency, where he was born in 1923. He went to a Dutch elementary school before pursuing further studies in Islamic schools, and after the Japanese invasion of the Dutch East Indies he moved to Batavia to enroll in Abdoel Kahar Moezakir's Jakarta Islamic Institute. During his time there, he joined Chaerul Saleh's group of nationalist youths.

== Career ==
Following the proclamation of Indonesian independence, Gayo led a group of nationalist youths in taking over the assets of the government railway company, with its Japanese guards offering no resistance. Gayo proceeded to lead the company's publication, Suara Kereta Api, before joining the Greater Jakarta People's Militia upon the arrival of Allied forces and later joining the guerilla fighting in West and Central Java. He was for a time imprisoned by the Indonesian Army following a crackdown on irregular militia forces in 1947. During this time, he also took part in the publication of the English-language magazine Voice of Free Indonesia.

After the end of the Indonesian revolution, Gayo worked as a journalist at the Indonesia Raya newspaper. He then co-founded Suluh Indonesia, the party newspaper of the Indonesian National Party, alongside Sayuti Melik and Satya Graha. In 1960, he was appointed to the Provisional People's Consultative Assembly, which was chaired by Saleh.

He died in Jakarta on 26 January 1993, and was buried at Karet Bivak Cemetery. Acehnese officials have voiced their support in awarding Gayo a National Hero of Indonesia title. A horse racing venue in Central Aceh is named after him.
