= Mat Depok =

- Born: Daeran c. 1910
- Died: October 24, 1993 (aged 82–83); Depok, Indonesia
- Father: Sa’ari
- Military Career
- Allegiance: Indonesia
- Service years: 1945-1949
- Unit: Oesaha Pemoeda Indonesia
- Conflicts: Indonesian National Revolution

Mat Depok (1910 - October 24, 1993) was a strongman and independence fighter from Depok.

== Early life ==
Mat Depok was born with the name Daeran in 1910 to Sa'ari and Dama. His mother was a businesswoman who ran a bridal makeup and food stall in Depok.

In 1935, Daeran went to Kampong Berlan in Matraman and met a woman from Karawang named Nyai Emah. Mat Depok was attracted to Nyai Emah's beauty and wanted to make her his wife. However, Nyai Emah was already the concubine of a Dutchman. Therefore, Mat Depok took Nyai Emah away and brought her to the house of his silat teacher, Misar, in Pengasinan. This act made him a fugitive from the Dutch. Upon arriving at his teacher's house, Misar slashed Mat Depok, intending to test his invulnerability, and the result showed that Mat Depok was indeed invulnerable.

Daeran once robbed a Dutch logistics warehouse and this made him imprisoned on Onrust Island. In 1942, Mat Depok was released from prison by the Japanese. After being released from prison, Mat Depok joined the anti-fascist movement, Banteng Merah.

== Indonesian National Revolution ==
On October 11, 1945, Daeran led a raid on the Depok Dutch neighborhood, which led him to receive the nickname Mat Depok. In addition, he joined the youth brigade called Oesaha Pemoeda Indonesia (Effort of Indonesian Youth) with Imam Syafei to fight against the Dutch army. In the battle against the Dutch, he was always at the forefront.

Sutan Sjahrir's decision to make Jakarta a city of diplomacy caused Mat Depok to move to Karawang. In 1947, Mat Depok was captured by the Dutch in Karawang and thrown into Nusakambangan Prison. While in prison, he got a tattoo on his chest that stated Mat Depok. After the transfer of sovereignty, Mat Depok was released from prison and returned to Tanahbaru, Depok.

== Post-Transfer of Sovereignty Period ==
Upon arriving in Tanahbaru, Mat Depok became a thug who asked for money from drivers who passed through the Tanahbaru intersection. If there was a car that ran away, he would throw a machete at the car to stop it. The money he obtained was distributed to local youths to rehabilitate roads and build a cemetery. Furthermore, he also helped Imam Syafei maintain security. When Syafei became Minister of State Security, Mat Depok also assisted him.

Mat Depok died on October 24, 1993. In 2017, the Depok Arts Council and the Ngumpul Betawi Studio held a lenong performance with the play Mat Depok: Pernikahan di Ujung Bedil (Mat Depok: Marriage at the End of a Gun). This play told the story of Mat Depok and Nyai Emah.

== Personal life ==
Mat Depok had at least three wives: Risah, Aminah bin Midin, and Emah. From his three wives, he had five children.
