= Suluh Indonesia =

Defunct Indonesian newspaper

- Type: Daily newspaper
- Format: Broadsheet
- Founded: 1 October 1953
- Ceased publication: 3 October 1965
- Language: Indonesian
- Headquarters: Jakarta
- Country: Indonesia

Suluh Indonesia was a daily Indonesian language newspaper based in Jakarta which was published between 1953 and 1965. It was strongly affiliated with the Indonesian National Party. The newspaper was one of the largest in the country during the 1950s and occupied first place in terms of circulation during the early 1960s. It was banned from circulation following the 30 September movement in 1965.

== History ==
In the 1950s, most major Indonesian political parties had an affiliated newspaper, such as Masyumi's Abadi and the Indonesian Communist Party's Harian Rakjat. However, the Indonesian National Party (PNI) did not have one, and thus its chairman Sidik Djojosukarto organized a meeting in which the party's leaders agreed to publish a newspaper as a campaign media for the upcoming 1955 election. The first edition of the newspaper was published on 1 October 1953, with a four-page edition and an initial issuance of 75,000. It was initially published between Monday and Saturday, with Mohammad Tabrani as its chief executive officer and Sayuti Melik serving as editor-in-chief.

By the mid-1950s, the newspaper was one of the best-selling papers in the country, with a daily issue of around 40,000, behind Harian Rakjat and the Indonesian Socialist Party's Pedoman. The newspaper openly supported President Sukarno's 1959 Decree, having called for the return of Indonesia to a presidential system in the preceding months. In the 1960s, the paper had the highest daily circulation in Indonesia, with an estimated 50,000 issuance daily in 1964.

In the immediate aftermath of the 30 September movement, the newspaper was banned by the security forces, with its final edition being published on 2 October 1965. Some of the newspaper's editors founded new newspapers, such as El Bahar and Suluh Marhaen, and maintained a pro-Sukarno stance.

== Content ==
Suluh Indonesia featured a daily "Dari Sabang Sampai Merauke" column, which featured news reports from across Indonesia, and columns dedicated to news on children. The paper generally restrained from reporting that could be perceived as anti-communist, in order to avoid Sukarno's anger.

== People ==
- Mohammad Tabrani (chief executive officer)
- Sayuti Melik (editor-in-chief, 1953)
- Manai Sophiaan (editor-in-chief, 1953-?)
- Jusuf Muda Dalam (editor-in-chief, 1956–1957)
- Mohammad Isnaeni (editor-in-chief, 1957–1965)
- Satya Graha (editor-in-chief, 1965)
- Hasan Gayo (journalist, starting in 1953)
