= Adian Husaini =

Doctor Adian Husaini
- Born: 17 December 1965 (age 60); Bojonegoro, East Java, Indonesia
- Occupations: Islamic scholar, journalist

Academic background
- Education: IPB, Jayabaya University Jakarta (M.A.), Institute of Islamic Thought and Civilization-International Islamic University Malaysia (Ph.D)
- Thesis: 'Pragmatism of Israeli Foreign Policy'

Dr. Adian Husaini (born 17 December 1965) is an Islamic scholar from Indonesia.

He served on numerous organizations, including the chairman of the Council of Da'wah Islamiyah Indonesia (Indonesian Islamic Propagation Council), the secretary general of the Indonesian Committee for the Islamic World Solidarity (KISDI), the Indonesian Committee for Solidarity Palestine - Indonesian Ulema Council (KISP-MUI), the Commission on Religious Harmony of Indonesian Ulema Council (MUI), and a member of the board of Majlis Tabligh Muhammadiyah.

== Early life ==
He obtained his Islamic education in Madrasah Diniyah Nurul Ilmi Bojonegoro from 1971 to 1977, Pondok Pesantren Ar Rasyid Kendal Bojonegoro from 1981 to 1984, Pondok Pesantren Ulil Albab Bogor from 1988 to 1989, Arabic Language Education Institute, and LIPIA Jakarta in 1988.

His undergraduate degree in veterinary is from Bogor Agricultural University (IPB), while his master's degree in international relations is obtained from the Postgraduate Program of International Relations of Jayabaya University Jakarta, with a thesis entitled Pragmatism of Israeli Foreign Policy. He holds a doctorate from the Institute of Islamic Thought and Civilization-International Islamic University Malaysia (ISTAC-IIUM) in the field of Islamic thought and civilization.

== Scholastic career ==
He worked as a researcher at the Indonesian Society for Middle East Studies (ISMES) Jakarta and the Institute for the Study of Islamic Thought & Civilizations (INSIST), and staff at the Center for Middle Eastern and Islamic Studies University of Indonesia (PKTTI-UI) Jakarta.

He has also been a journalist for Jakarta Daily News Buana, Republika Jakarta Daily, and a news analyst at Radio Muslim FM Jakarta, as well as a lecturer of Journalism and Islamic thought at the Ibnu Khaldun University of Bogor and Pesantren Tinggi (Ma'had 'Aly) Husnayain Jakarta.

He writes many books, with most of his works being the criticism against the perceived rise of the liberal Islamic movement, especially in Indonesia. His book Pluralisme Agama: Haram (Religious Pluralism: Haram) challenged the liberal and progressive criticisms of the 2005 fatwa by the Indonesian Ulema Council targeting religious pluralism. In his writings, he considers religious pluralism as an ideology that considers all religions to be true, thus undermining the legitimacy of Islam. His book Christian-Western Hegemony in Islamic Studies in Higher Education was voted the 2nd best book of the Islamic Book Fair of 2007. At the same forum a year earlier, his book entitled The Face of Western Civilization: From Christian Hegemony to Secular-Liberal Dominance became the best non-fiction book.
