= Soemarso Soemarsono =

Indonesian journalist (1928–1981)

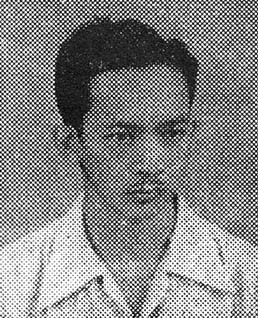
- Soemarsono, c. 1954
- Born: 19 August 1928; Magetan, Dutch East Indies
- Died: 20 March 1981 (aged 52); Jakarta, Indonesia

Soemarso Soemarsono (19 August 1928 – 20 March 1981) was an Indonesian political activist and journalist. He was active in Masyumi-affiliated organizations during the Sukarno period and was imprisoned during the mid-1960s. He then worked at the Abadi newspaper during the Suharto era, was imprisoned again due to a report, and died before his trial.

== Early life ==
Soemarso Soemarsono was born on 19 August 1928 in Magetan Regency, in Madiun Residency.

== Career ==
In 1945, Soemarsono joined the Indonesian Islamic Youth Movement (GPII), a youth organization affiliated with the Islamist Masyumi party. Soemarsono's father was killed in the Madiun Affair of 1948, which caused Soemarsono to develop a strong disdain of the Indonesian Communist Party. He then became a journalist for the Masyumi-affiliated Abadi newspaper. On 9 December 1963, Soemarsono was arrested under charges of sedition, as Masyumi-affiliated politicians had opposed Sukarno's "Guided Democracy". He was initially incarcerated at Surabaya's Kalisosok Prison, later being relocated to Jakarta.

Soemarsono in 1971 would publish a memoir of his time in prison during the Sukarno era.

=== Abadi and death ===
Following Sukarno's fall from power, Soemarsono was released from prison and rejoined Abadi, which had been revived in 1968 by former prime minister Burhanuddin Harahap, becoming a member of its editorial board. The paper was censured again following the Malari incident in 1974. In 1979, Soemarsono was arrested under charges of publishing state secrets, as he had published electoral archives from the 1977 Indonesian legislative election. He was also accused of taking part in a student protest movement. Amnesty International would designate him as a prisoner of conscience.

While still under house arrest, Soemarsono died on 20 March 1981 in Jakarta. He was buried at the Menteng Pulo cemetery.
