= Mohammad Tabrani =

Indonesian journalist and politician

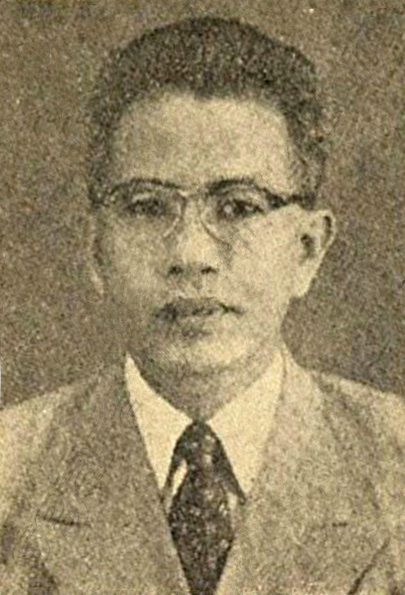
- Born: 10 October 1904; Pamekasan, Dutch East Indies
- Died: 12 January 1984 (aged 79)

Mohammad Tabrani Soerjowitjitro (10 October 1904 – 12 January 1984) was an Indonesian journalist and politician. He originated from the island of Madura and received journalistic education in Europe. In his early journalistic career, Tabrani was a major proponent of the Indonesian language as a national language. Later on, he became the editor of the Pemandangan newspaper and promoted the independence of Indonesia through parliamentary means.

== Early life and education ==
Tabrani was born in Pamekasan, Madura, on 10 October 1904 and he began his education at a MULO in Surabaya, before continuing to an AMS in Bandung. He then enrolled at the civil servant school for native Indonesians (Opleiding School Voor Inlandsche Ambtenaren), still in Bandung. During this period, he was active in youth nationalist organizations such as the Jong Java.

== Career ==
Tabrani had begun to work as a journalist in Agus Salim's newspaper Hindia Baroe, where he was a senior journalist by 1926. At Hindia Baroe, Tabrani wrote an editorial on 10 January 1926, where he first proposed the term "Bahasa Indonesia" (Indonesian language) to refer to the common language used by people in the Indies. In another editorial titled "Bahasa Indonesia" published a month later on 11 February, he was more openly nationalistic:

The Indonesian nation does not yet exist, then create it! The Indonesian language does not yet exist, then create it! (Note: Original: Bangsa Indonesia belum ada. Terbitkanlah bangsa Indonesia itu! Bahasa Indonesia belum ada. Terbitkanlah bahasa Indonesia itu!)

He later prepared and organized the First "Youth Congress" in 1926, which brought together several Indonesian youth organizations. Tabrani chaired the preparatory committee for the congress itself. During the congress in 30 April – 2 May 1926, the attendees agreed on the use of the Malay language as the national language following a proposal by Mohammad Yamin, but Tabrani opposed, calling for the language to referred to as the "Indonesian language and not the Malay language, despite containing Malay elements".

During the Second Youth Congress of 1928, which resulted in the Youth Pledge, Tabrani was absent, as he was travelling and studying in Europe. For some time, he also studied journalism in Berlin and Cologne, in addition to studying German stenography which he completed in 1929 at The Hague. To gain journalistic experience, he also worked at Dutch newspapers Het Volk and De Telegraaf. He remained in Europe until 1931. In 1929, while at The Hague, he published a book titled Ons Wapen: den national Indonesische pers and hare organisatie, which outlined plans to develop nationalist newspapers in Indonesia.

Tabrani organized a political party in September 1930, the Partai Rakjat Indonesia (Indonesian People's Party) which advocated collaboration with Dutch authorities and called for parliamentary pursuits of Indonesian independence, though it did not gain much traction. He also started a political magazine titled Revue Politik, before later on joining the newspaper Pemandangan as its editor. After the Soetardjo Petition of 1936 was submitted to the Volksraad, Tabrani (as Pemandangan's editor at the time) was an enthusiastic supporter, and he successfully campaigned for the creation of a committee to implement the petition.

Tabrani then participated in the first congress of the Indonesian Journalists' Union (Persatoean Djoernalis Indonesia/Perdi) in 1934, when he spoke on "Journalism and the movement and the public interest." Tabrani was later elected as chairman of that organization in 1938, and reelected in 1939. During his presidency and time at Pemandangan, the Second World War erupted in Europe, and immediately after the Dutch capitulation the Dutch police banned Pemandangan for an article published on it. There was also a public affair with Volksraad member Mohammad Husni Thamrin, who questioned Pemandangan's coverage of the war. Eventually, Tabrani resigned his Perdi presidency in 1940. In June 1940, Tabrani attacked Thamrin through an editorial, accusing Thamrin of not securing the release of Amir Sjarifuddin. Tabrani later entered service of the colonial government, heading the data section of the war propaganda department.

Following the Japanese invasion and the ensuing occupation, Tabrani for some time worked as an editor of the Tjahaja newspaper based in Bandung. He was at some point during the occupation imprisoned and was tortured, crippling his leg. After his release, he became chief editor of the Japanese-sponsored newspaper Indonesia Merdeka.

During the Indonesian National Revolution, Tabrani acted as secretary of the war and political prisoners committee. After Indonesia's independence, he for some time managed the PNI-owned Suluh Indonesia newspaper. In 1973, after some convincing from former Jakarta mayor Sudiro, he published his memoir of the First Youth Congress. He died on 12 January 1984.

== Legacy ==
Tabrani is often credited with the creation of the Indonesian language, and the Language Development Agency of the Ministry of Education of Culture proposed in 2019 that Tabrani be made a National Hero of Indonesia. His grave in the Tanah Kusir Cemetery in Jakarta is a memorial site dedicated to his work. On 10 November 2023, Joko Widodo awarded the title of National Hero to Tabrani.

== Bibliography ==
- Abeyasekere, Susan (1973). "The Soetardjo Petition". Indonesia. 15 (15): 81–108. doi:10.2307/3350793. hdl:1813/53559. ISSN 0019-7289. JSTOR 3350793.
- Government of Jakarta (2017). "Mohammad Tabrani" (in Indonesian).
- Horton, William Bradley (2018). "A Fictional Detective's Exploration of the Swirling Maelstrom of Indonesia in the Early 1940s: Patjar Koening and the Mysterious Death of Moh. Hoesni Thamrin". International Journal of Indonesian Studies: 93–108.
- Indriani (18 July 2019). "Kemendikbud usulkan Mohammad Tabrani sebagai pahlawan nasional". Antara News (in Indonesian).
- Kahin, George McTurnan (2003). Nationalism and Revolution in Indonesia. SEAP Publications. ISBN 978-0-87727-734-7.
- Maryanto. "Sang Penggagas Bahasa Persatuan Indonesia". badanbahasa.kemdikbud.go.id (in Indonesian).
- "Penggagas Kongres Pemuda Pertama". Tempo (in Indonesian). 27 October 2008.
- Toer, Pramoedya Ananta (2014). Kronik Revolusi Indonesia jilid V (in Indonesian). Kepustakaan Populer Gramedia. ISBN 978-979-9106-89-6.
- Yamamoto, Nobuto (2014). "The Dynamics of Contentious Politics in The Indies: Inlandsche Journalisten Bond and Persatoean Djoernalis Indonesia" (PDF). Keio Communication Review. 36: 5–20.
