= Karim Halim =

Indonesian poet

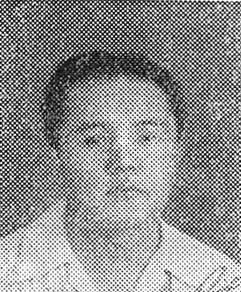
Halim circa 1954

Karim Halim (December 1918 in Sumatera Barat – 1989) was an Indonesian literary writer. For his prose works, he most commonly wrote under his own name, but for poetry he often wrote under the pseudonym R.O. Hanka. He reportedly also used the pseudonyms Atma Anoma and Sekarijadi.

== Education ==
He attended a Sekolah Melayu in his hometown, then continued his education in a "linking" Schakelschool which allowed him to continue to a European system Mulo school. In 1941, Karim continued his education in an HIK Muhammadiyah school in Solo, Central Java. In 1955, Karim was given a UNESCO certificate.

== Career ==
Halim began to write poetry while he was a student, publishing poetry in Adil, Panji Islam, Pedoman Masyarakat, Islam Raja, and Pujangga Baru. During this period, Karim's poetry tended to have a sad tone. In his contributions during the "pujangga baru" period in the late 1930s and early 1940s, his poetry was influenced by his education, and thus was Islamic flavored, for example a poem entitled "Goda". His first novelette was probably Fadjar Menjingsing which appeared in the Medan literary periodical Doenia Pengalaman in 1940. In early 1945, Karim Halim published a novel, Roman-Pantjaroba-Palawidja which describes looting and anti-Chinese violence in West Java during the beginning of the Japanese occupation, but which seems also to have been intended as propaganda for the Japanese sponsored Javanese defense force PETA which was founded around the time the novel was written. He was also engaged in translating literary works, including a 1945 translation of Sakae Shioya's Chushingura: An Exposition (Tokyo, 1940), which he undertook with HB Jassin.
