= Indonesian Journalists Association =

- Persatuan Wartawan Indonesia
- Formation: February 9, 1946; 80 years ago
- Headquarters: Dewan Pers, 34, Jalan Kebon Sirih, RW 07, Kebon Sirih, Menteng, Jakarta Special Capital Region, 10110, Indonesia
- Location: Indonesia
- Chairman: Margiono
- Chairman of the Honorary Board: Ilham Bintang
- Website: www.pwi.or.id

The Indonesian Journalists Association (Indonesian: Persatuan Wartawan Indonesia), also known by its Indonesian initials PWI, is the first professional journalist organization in Indonesia. PWI was established on 9 February 1946 in Surakarta (this date was designated under the New Order in 1985 to become National Press Day). PWI consists of journalists spread all over Indonesia. Currently PWI is led by Margiono as chairman who has served from 2013 to 2018.

== History ==
The establishment of the PWI organization became the beginning of Indonesia's struggle against colonialism in Indonesia through media and writing. After the establishment of PWI, similar organizations were also established. The organization was the Newspaper Publishers Union (SPS; Indonesian: Serikat Penerbit Suratkabar) on 8 June 1946. The SPS changed its name to the Press Company Union (SPP; Indonesian: Serikat Perusahaan Pers) in 2011, coinciding with the 65th SPS anniversary. The interest in establishing SPS at that time departed from the idea that the ranks of national press publishers needed to be immediately organized and managed, in its idiomatic and commercial terms, considering that the colonial press and foreign press were still alive and still trying to maintain its influence. Because the distance of time of establishment is close and has a similar historical background, PWI and SPS are likened to "conjoined twins" in the world of journalism.

== Business committee ==
Before its establishment, PWI formed a preparatory committee in the beginning of the beginning of 1946. The preparatory committee was formed on 9–10 February 1946 at the Sono Suko meeting hall, Surakarta, when a meeting was held between Indonesian journalists. The meeting was attended by various journalists, including press figures who were leading newspapers, magazines, journalists and fighters. The meeting resulted in two decisions, including:

- Approved to form an Indonesian journalists organization, chaired by Sumanang Surjowinoto with the secretary Sudarjo Tjokrosisworo.
- Approved to form a committee consisting of:
  1. Sjamsuddin Sutan Makmur (Harian Rakyat Jakarta)
  2. Burhanuddin Mohammad Diah (Harian Merdeka)
  3. Abdul Rachmat Nasution (Antara)
  4. Ronggodanukusumo (Suara Rakyat, Mojokerto)
  5. Mohammad Kurdie (Suara Merdeka, Tasikmalaya)
  6. Bambang Suprapto (Pembela Rakyat, Magelang)
  7. Sudjono (Koran Berjuang, Malang)
  8. Suprijo Djojosupadmo (Kedaulatan Rakyat, Yogyakarta).

The eight commissions that have been formed are then assisted by Sumanang and Sudarjo Tjokrosisworo formulated the matters of the national press at that time and the effort to coordinate it into a national press line. The 10-member commission was also called the "Business Committee". Three weeks later, the Business Committee held a meeting again in Surakarta to coincide with the session of the Central Indonesian National Committee which took place from 28 February to March 1946. The Business Committee held a meeting and discussed the issues faced by the press. From the meeting it was then agreed to establish a Newspaper Company Union in order to coordinate newspaper business associations whose founders were the founders of PWI.

== Membership ==
Membership is now spread throughout Indonesia, including Riau, East Java, Banten, East Kalimantan, West Kalimantan, West Java and Lampung.
