= Indonesian Islamic Propagation Council =

Islamic organization based in Indonesia

- Dewan Da'wah Islamiyah Indonesia
- Formation: February 26, 1967; 59 years ago
- Founder: Mohammad Natsir, Mohammad Rasjidi, Buchari Tamam, Nawawi Duski, Hasan Basri
- Type: Religious organization
- Headquarters: Jakarta, Indonesia
- Location: Kramat, Senen, Central Jakarta
- Region served: Nationwide
- Chairman: Dr. Adian Husaini, M.Si.
- Website: www.dewandakwah.or.id

The Indonesian Islamic Propagation Council (Indonesian: Dewan Da'wah Islamiyah Indonesia, abbreviated as DDII) is a Sunni Islamic organization in Indonesia which aimed at dawah (proselytizing). The organization is considered one of the most prominent dawah organisations in modern Indonesia. It is also noted for being the primary receiver (along with the LIPIA) of funding for Islamic activities in Indonesia from Saudi Arabia.

== History ==
The DDII was founded in 1967 by Mohammad Natsir, a leading figure in the Indonesian independence movement, the former leader of the Masjumi Party and a leader of the Islamic revival in Indonesia and interaction with the Middle East. Following the disbanded Masyumi party, Natsir and other former members of the party met to create the DDII. According to Hasan Noorhaidi "from its inception" the DDII was the "Indonesian representative" of the Saudi-funded Muslim World League. The group sought closeness to Saudi as protection against the marginalization of Islamic politics by the pro-development, pro-modernization Suharto government.

According to the DDII, it is the main institution in Indonesia for distributing scholarships from the Saudi-funded Muslim World League to study in the Middle East. DDII has also works to encourage the translation of works by salafi scholars into Indonesian. DDII Cadres include Ahmad Faiz Asifuddin, Aunur Rafiq Ghufran and Chamsaha Sofwan (known now as Abu Nida). According to its website it has built and manages over 750 mosques, has a university level training programs for du’āt (preachers), teachers and rural development workers (known as Mohammad Natsir Institute for Dakwah in Tambun, Bekasi Regency), graduates of which are placed particularly in the remote and isolated regions.

DDII focuses on appealing to the lower middle class and urban poor promoting shariah law and Islamic ritual observance as a solution to societal ills, and according to one critic attacking "governmental corruption, Javanese mysticism, Muslim liberalism and the economic dominance of the Chinese" as symptoms of a larger conspiracy to Christianize Indonesia. In 2014, DDII was characterized with "strong anti-Shi‘a, anti-Christian, and anti-Ahmadiyah views" and "scripturally rigid" position on Islamic creed.

== See also ==
- Islam in Indonesia
