= Asia Raya =

Newspaper in the Dutch East Indies during the Japanese occupation

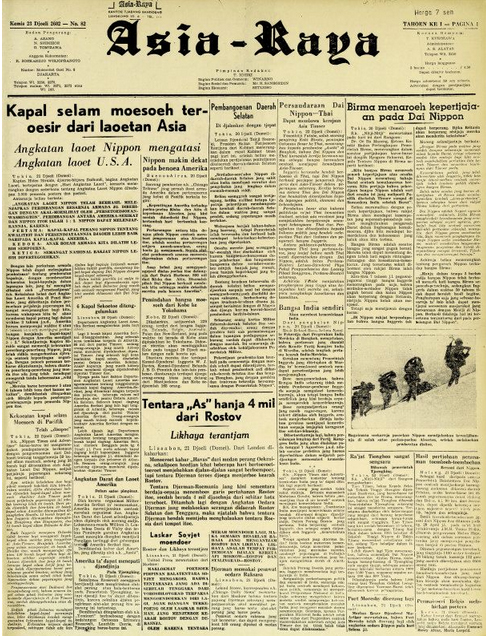
Front page, 23 July 1942

Asia Raya (also spelled Asia-Raja; 'Grand Asia') was a newspaper published in the Dutch East Indies (modern day Indonesia) during the Japanese occupation.

== Background ==
When the Japanese Empire occupied the Dutch East Indies in 1942, they tasked a group of writers and intellectuals to better integrate the native society; this was done in other occupied countries as well. Approximately 190 people of this "Propaganda Division" arrived in Batavia (modern day Jakarta) in early 1942, including novelist Tomoji Abe. Among their efforts was the founding of a newspaper, entitled Asia Raya. This newspaper involved both Japanese and native persons in his management and publication.

== History ==
The first edition of Asia Raya, totaling four pages in length, was published on 29 April 1942. It was subsequently published daily. The initial print run of 15,000 copies sold at 10 Netherlands Indies cents each. Much of its native editorial staff originated from the Great Indonesia Party (Partai Indonesia Raya, or Parindra) journal Berita Oemoem, a conservative publication. Others originated from more radical, generally leftist, groups. Within a few weeks of its first issue, the newspaper recorded a circulation of 23,000 - a significant amount compared to newspapers published in the Dutch period.

In February 1943, the censorship bureau passed a decree declaring that Asia Raya could no longer publish four pages daily. Owing to a paper shortage caused by the Japanese war effort, the newspaper was limited to two pages daily, with an option for a four-page edition once a week; the board also called for an increase in subscription fees. This took effect in March of that year. In 1944 a surcharge was added to allegedly help pay the salaries of forced labourers and Pembela Tanah Air (PETA) troops.

On 12 March 1945, Asia Raya held a round-table conference at Miyako Hotel in Batavia. Numerous speakers from the New Life Movement (Gerakan Hidoep Baroe), led by Sukarno and Mohammad Hatta, held discourses on ways to invigorate the independence movement. These speakers included future government ministers Oto Iskandar di Nata and Maria Ulfah Santoso, as well as future Prime Minister of Indonesia Sutan Sjahrir. Asia Raya published in-depth transcriptions of the proceedings over a period of three days.

After the Proclamation of Indonesian Independence on 17 August 1945, Asia Raya continued to publish. It focused mainly on details of the new native-run government and the bombings of Hiroshima and Nagasaki. It continued to publish until 7 September 1945, when it ran a large headline reading "Asia Raya Minta Diri" ("Asia Raya Recusing Itself"), ceasing publication due to the change in government.

Today, each edition of Asia Raya has been set on microfilm and is held at the National Archives of Indonesia.

== Politics ==
As a propaganda tool, Asia Raya emphasised Japan's visions for a united, prosperous Asia and minimised any coverage of Japanese war crimes. Where coverage could stir up resentment, the paper presented the subject in a positive light; for example, forced labourers going to work outside of Java were described as heroes.

The language used was decidedly pro-Japanese. While Japanese troops were described as "brave" and "powerful", the Allies were described as "wavering", "indecisive", and "weak". These portrayals carried over into the newspaper's advertisements.

== Notable staff ==
- Oene Djoenaidi, deputy director
- Sanusi Pane, culture columnist
- Sukarjo Wiryopranoto, director
- Sumanang Suryowinoto, deputy director
- Anwar Tjokroaminoto, deputy director

== Notable contributors ==
Several notable writers contributed poems, short stories, and serials to Asia Raya:

- Achdiat K. Mihardja, short stories
- Andjar Asmara, short stories and serials
- Bakri Siregar, short stories
- HB Jassin, poems and short stories
- M. Balfas, short stories
- Roestam Effendi, poems
- Rosihan Anwar, poems and short stories
- Usmar Ismail, poems and short stories
- Rabindranath Tagore in translation
- Mahatma Gandhi in translation
