= Jusuf Muda Dalam =

Indonesian politician (1914–1976)

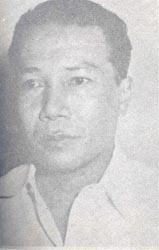
- Dalam, c. 1950s

5th Governor of Bank Indonesia
- In office 13 November 1963 – 27 March 1966
- President: Sukarno
- Preceded by: Sumarno
- Succeeded by: Radius Prawiro

2nd Minister for Central Bank Affairs
- In office 27 August 1964 – 18 March 1966
- President: Sukarno
- Preceded by: Sumarno
- Succeeded by: Sumarno (ad interim); Radius Prawiro

Personal details
- Born: Teuku Jusuf Muda Dalam; 10 December 1914 Sigli, Aceh, Dutch East Indies
- Died: 26 August 1976 (aged 61) Cimahi, West Java, Indonesia
- Party: Indonesian Communist Party; Indonesian National Party
- Profession: Journalist; Politician

Teuku Jusuf Muda Dalam (10 December 1914 – 26 August 1976) was an Indonesian journalist and politician who served as the Governor of Bank Indonesia, Indonesia's central bank, from 1963 to 1966.

Originating from Aceh, he studied in the Netherlands where he developed communist ties, became active in journalism, and took part in the Dutch resistance. After returning to Indonesia, he for a time was a member of the Indonesian Communist Party, until he moved to the Indonesian National Party in 1954. He led the party newspaper Suluh Indonesia and became leader of Bank Negara Indonesia, before being appointed BI governor in 1963. After Sukarno's fall, he was removed from power in 1966, sentenced to death on corruption charges, and died as a prisoner.

== Early life and education ==
Dalam was born in Sigli, Aceh on 10 December 1914. He moved to the Netherlands for studies in 1929, went to the Netherlands School of Economics and became active in the Roepi Indonesian student organization where he served as its vice-chairman and managed the organization's magazine. During the German occupation of the Netherlands, Dalam took part in the Dutch resistance, managing the underground newspaper De Bevrijding ("Liberation") in Rotterdam. He developed relations with the Communist Party of the Netherlands, and became a journalist for the party's newspaper De Waarheid. He returned to Indonesia in March 1947.

== Career ==
After his return to Indonesia, he joined the Indonesian Communist Party (PKI), and worked in the propaganda department of the Indonesian Ministry of Defense. In the aftermath of the Madiun Affair in 1948, he was incarcerated for several months in Yogyakarta. In 1950, he had been released, and along with I. J. Kasimo was tasked with an investigation of land use in East Sumatra. He later left PKI, and joined the Indonesian National Party (PNI) in 1954. At that time, he was already a member of the Provisional People's Representative Council.

He was then appointed as first a staffer in the state-owned Bank Negara Indonesia in 1956, then as a director in 1957 and president director by 1959. Around the same time, he was also editor-in-chief of the PNI's party newspaper, Suluh Indonesia, until his replacement by Mohammad Isnaeni in 1957. In the midst of the Western New Guinea dispute, president Sukarno appointed Dalam into the National Economic Command in April 1962, before he was appointed as State Minister for Central Bank Affairs (i.e. Central Bank Governor) in the Third Working Cabinet on 13 November 1963. He would maintain this position until his replacement on 27 March 1966 by Radius Prawiro in the Second Revised Dwikora Cabinet. During this three-year tenure, he consolidated all state-owned banks, including Bank Indonesia and Bank Negara Indonesia, into a single institution, ostensibly to make it easier to manage.

== Trial and death ==
After the 30 September movement and Sukarno's fall from power, Dalam was arrested and accused of corruption amounting to Rp 97.3 billion through irregularities in duties paid by importers to obtain foreign currency. (Note: In December 1966, the Indonesian rupiah had an exchange rate of around 125 rupiah to the U.S. dollar.) Newspapers at that time reported that Dalam had multiple mistresses who enjoyed luxurious lifestyles. On top of his corruption charge, he was also accused of illegal firearms possession, subversion, and extralegal marriage. Dalam was sentenced to death on 8 April 1967, making him the first, and as of 2022 the only, Indonesian politician to be sentenced to death on corruption charges. His appeals were rejected.

Jusuf was held in a home instead of a regular prison, with all his wives and mistresses except his first wife Sutiasmi divorcing him. Before his sentence could be carried out, he died from tetanus in Cimahi on 26 August 1976, still as a death row prisoner.

== Notes ==
Government offices
Preceded by Sumarno	Governor of Bank Indonesia; 1963–1966	Succeeded by Radius Prawiro
Political offices
Preceded by Sri Mulyani	Minister for Central Bank Affairs; 1964–1966	Succeeded by Chatib Basri
