= Soemanang Soerjowinoto =

Indonesian politician and journalist

Raden Mas Soemanang Soerjowinoto
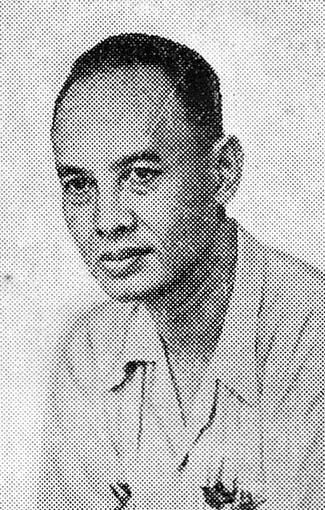
- Official portrait, c. 1954

10th Minister of Economic Affairs
- In office 4 April 1952 – 3 June 1953
- Prime Minister: Wilopo
- Preceded by: Wilopo
- Succeeded by: Iskaq Tjokrohadisurjo

Member of the People's Representative Council
- In office 16 August 1950 – 13 March 1954

United States of Indonesia Senator from the Republic of Indonesia
- In office 16 February 1950 – 16 August 1950

Personal details
- Born: 1 May 1908 Yogyakarta, Dutch East Indies
- Died: 13 June 1988 (aged 80) Jakarta, Indonesia
- Party: Indonesian National Party

Soemanang Soerjowinoto (EYD: Sumanang Suryowinoto; 1 May 1908 – 13 June 1988) was an Indonesian journalist, politician, and banker.

Born in Yogyakarta, Soemanang entered journalism after working in law for some time, founding his first newspaper in 1937. He was one of the co-founders of the Antara news agency and he was a chief editor of the Pemandangan newspaper during the Japanese occupation of the Dutch East Indies. After Indonesia's independence, he founded the Nasional newspaper, became the first chairman of the Indonesian Journalists Association, and joined the Central Indonesian National Committee, becoming a senator in the United States of Indonesia and later Minister of Economic Affairs under Wilopo's prime ministership. Following this political career, Soemanang served as a director in two banks before becoming an executive director at the International Monetary Fund.

== Early life and education ==
Soemanang was born in Yogyakarta, then part of the Dutch East Indies, on 1 May 1908. He was a descendant of the Pakualaman noble family, and his father was a mid-ranking official in the Yogyakarta Sultanate.

He studied at the Rechts-Hogeschool (Law High School) in Batavia, specializing in socioeconomic affairs.

== Career ==
=== Dutch East Indies era ===
Under the Dutch administration, Soemanang worked as a civil servant for the Semarang landraad. He also worked for the Japanese Consulate in Batavia between 1936 and 1940, where he was a translator. He then became the legal adviser for the Tjahaja Timoer newspaper.

In 1937, Soemanang (who had entered politics and joined the Gerindo political party) founded a weekly publication in Bogor, named Perantaraan. He later proposed the founding of a national news agency. Alongside other young politically active journalists such as Sanusi Pane and Adam Malik, they founded the Antara news agency which derived its name from Perantaraan. Soemanang became the agency's first chief editor. The following year, he left Antara and became the head of the Perguruan Rakyat school replacing Amir Sjarifuddin. He continued to work in journalism, becoming the chief editor of the Pemandangan newspaper in 1940.

Sumanang participated in the First Indonesian Language Congress in Surakarta on 25 June 1938, which aimed to standardize the Indonesian language - then recently declared as the national language following the 1928 Youth Pledge. Sumanang had offered to gather influential businesspeople and scholars to the congress after a spontaneous request by fellow journalist Soedarjo Tjokrosisworo.

=== Japanese occupation ===
During the Japanese occupation of the Dutch East Indies, Soemanang worked in the Japanese-founded Asia Raya newspaper and later headed the press department of the labor organization PUTERA. During this period, he had been arrested due to a photo published in Pemandangan showing the Japanese Emperor Hirohito obscured by the Japanese flag. Another incident close to the end of the war saw Soemanang arrested for another image of Hirohito stained by red ink from the flag and resulted in the Japanese authorities forcing Pemandangan to be published as Pembangoenan.

=== Post-independence ===
Shortly after the proclamation of Indonesian independence, Sumanang co-founded the National Press Company (Badan Usaha Penerbitan Nasional). In 1946, the Indonesian Journalists Association was founded, and Soemanang was elected as its first chairman. He further founded the daily newspaper Nasional (today Bernas) in Yogyakarta in November 1946, in addition to the magazines Wanita Indonesia and Revue Indonesia, and the Javanese-language pamphlet Biwara.

Soemanang had also joined the Indonesian National Party, where he became the chair of its economic department in 1946. He was a member of the Central Indonesian National Committee, and he was later appointed as a representative of the Republic of Indonesia to the Senate of the United States of Indonesia, representing the Republic, in 1950, through the United States of Indonesia was defederalized six months after his appointment and Soemanang became a member of the Provisional People's Representative Council instead. He resigned on 13 March 1954. Soemanang was appointed as the Minister of Economic Affairs in the Wilopo Cabinet in April 1952. One of his policies was to return the oil wells in North Sumatra back to the control of Royal Dutch Shell, which faced fierce criticism from the parliament and he withdrew this decision. Additionally, alongside Interior Minister Mohammad Roem, Soemanang ordered the issuance of 50 million identity cards for registry purposes.

After his time as minister, Soemanang served as president director of the National Industrial Bank and the Indonesian Development Bank. He also served as an executive director in the International Monetary Fund for some time, representing Indonesia, Algeria, Ghana, Laos, Libya, Morocco and Tunisia. In 1979, he returned to the journalistic world, when he founded the short-lived magazines Sari Pers and Zaman in cooperation with the Tempo group.

He died in Jakarta on 13 June 1988. His grave is located in Yogyakarta.

== Bibliography ==
- Anderson, Benedict Richard O'Gorman (2006). Java in a Time of Revolution: Occupation and Resistance, 1944-1946. Equinox Publishing. ISBN 978-979-3780-14-6.
- Feith, Herbert (2009). The Wilopo Cabinet, 1952-1953: A Turning Point in Post-Revolutionary Indonesia. Equinox Publishing. ISBN 978-602-8397-15-5.
- Tim Penyusun Sejarah (1970). Seperempat Abad Dewan Perwakilan Rakjat Republik Indonesia [A Quarter Century of the People's Representative Council of the Republic of Indonesia] (PDF) (in Indonesian). Jakarta: Sekretariat DPR-GR. Archived from the original (PDF) on 7 April 2023.
