= Antara (news agency) =

Indonesian news agency

Coordinates: 6°10′52″S 106°49′26″E

Antara National News Agency Public Corporation
- Native name: Perusahaan Umum Lembaga Kantor Berita Nasional Antara
- Formerly: NV Kantor Berita Antara
- Type: Statutory corporation
- Industry: News media
- Founded: 13 December 1937
- Founders: Adam Malik; Soemanang Soerjowinoto; A.M. Sipahoetar; Pandu Kartawiguna
- Headquarters: Central Jakarta, Jakarta, Indonesia
- Area served: Worldwide
- Products: Wire service
- Revenue: ▼ Rp 133.2 billion (2010); Rp 137.8 billion (2009)
- Operating income: ▼ Rp 3.702 billion (2010); Rp 25.92 billion (2009)
- Net income: ▼ – Rp 0.813 billion (2010); Rp 1.659 billion (2009)
- Owner: Government of Indonesia
- Number of employees: 899 (2023)
- Website: korporat.antaranews.com en.antaranews.com

Antara is an Indonesian news agency organized as a statutory corporation. (Note: Article 6 of Government Regulation of the Republic of Indonesia No. 40 of 2007 stipulates that the agency's full name is Perusahaan Umum Lembaga Kantor Berita Nasional Antara (Antara National News Agency Institution - Public Corporation), abbreviated as Perum LKBN Antara. Antara itself literally translates to "inter" or "between".) It is the country's national news agency, supplying news reports to many domestic media organizations. It is the only organization authorized to distribute news materials created by foreign news agencies.

The news agency was founded in 1937, when the country was still a colony in the Dutch Empire, by independence activists dissatisfied with the lack of local coverage by the Dutch-owned Aneta news agency. Antara's operation was absorbed into the Dōmei Tsushin news network following invasion by the Japanese in 1942. Its staff played a key role in the broadcast of Indonesia's proclamation of independence and assumed control of the Dōmei facilities in the region at the end of the war. The agency remained under private management until it was placed under the control of the presidency in the 1960s when the government shifted its focus from decolonization to nation-building. Antara became an institution through which the state could promote its policies.

Following a wave of political reforms in the late 1990s, Antara began to produce its reporting with reduced government influence. It was then reorganized as a state-owned enterprise in 2007. Antara celebrated its 75th anniversary on 13 December 2012.

== History ==
=== Early years ===
Antara was established on 13 December 1937 in Batavia (later Jakarta), the colonial capital of the Dutch East Indies. Prior to its establishment, Dominique Willem Berretty had founded Aneta, the Indies' first news agency. A number of Dutch and indigenous firms were also in existence but did not achieve similar stature. As a Dutch agency, however, Aneta rarely included local news in its coverage. This led to dissatisfaction among independence activists Soemanang Soerjowinoto and Albert Manoempak Sipahoetar, who eventually decided to form a separate news agency.

Soemanang had been working at the Tjahaja Timoer newspaper, while Sipahoetar was an employee for a Dutch advertisement agency. The latter was also an acquaintance of Adam Malik, who had left Medan after Dutch authorities attempted to imprison him for political activism. The three met at Soemanang's residence with author Armijn Pane to discuss the establishment of the news agency. Soemanang named the agency Antara based on Perantaraan, (Note: "Antara" translates into English as "between". In addition to summarizing the agency's role as a link between news organizations and sources of information, Romano & Seinor (2005, p. 109) also note that the name describes the agency's position during the post-1998 period of political reforms as "somewhere 'between' repression and freedom".) a weekly magazine he had previously established in Bogor. He became its editor-in-chief, while Sipahoetar became a senior editor. Antara's first news bulletin reporting its own establishment, was reprinted in the newspapers Perasaan Kita on 14 December 1937 and Kebangoenan the following day. Sanusi Pane, Armijn Pane's older brother and Kebangoenan's editor-in-chief, and Perasaan Kita editor-in-chief Prawoto Soemodilogo were appointed to the agency's board of directors.

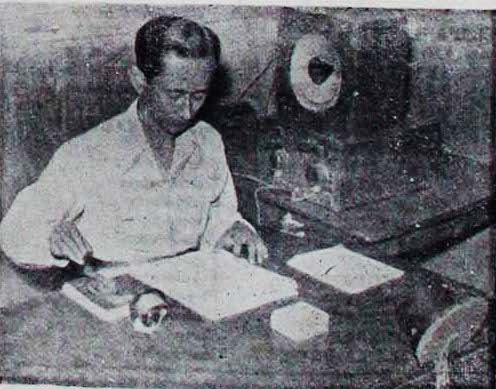
An Antara reporter uses wireless telegraphy to broadcast a dispatch, c. 1948.

The agency's leadership was later reorganized. Soemanang became Antara's managing editor, and while Malik became his deputy. Malik, twenty years old at the time, was credited with keeping the agency alive in its early years by building a base of supporters in the emerging indigenous middle class. After Soemanang left Antara in 1938 to become the director of the Pergoeroean Rakjat network of schools, Sipahoetar was promoted to editor-in-chief, and Pandu Kartawiguna became the agency's deputy editor-in-chief. Sipahoetar was later elevated to managing editor, but left the agency in 1939 because of an illness. Alwi Soetan Osman, an employee of the Indies' Ministry of Justice, briefly succeeded him as managing editor before being replaced by Pandoe Kartawigoena.

When Japanese forces took control of the Indies in 1942, the empire's Dōmei Tsushin news agency established a branch office in Jakarta. Antara was renamed Yashima on 29 May, and it was eventually absorbed by the Dōmei news network three months later. Press activity flourished as Dōmei opened offices in major cities throughout Java. When Indonesia's independence was proclaimed on 17 August 1945, Adam Malik obtained a copy of the text and dictated it by telephone to his colleagues at the agency. The resulting news bulletin slipped past Japanese censors and was broadcast throughout Dōmei's newswire network. Dōmei officials attempted to retract the bulletin, but a courier was able to deliver a copy of the proclamation using the agency's name to the Hōsō Kanrikyoku radio station in midst of the confusion. Antara assumed control of Dōmei's local network when the Japanese surrendered to Allied forces weeks later and reopened under private management on 3 September.

Antara's leading journalists soon saw a need for the agency to establish additional branches outside Jakarta. Sjahroedin, a former editor at Dōmei, opened one of these offices in British Singapore in February 1946. The branch received no funding from the newly formed Indonesian government and was housed in a three-story building in Raffles Place. Its goal was to "break the Dutch or Allied monopoly on news about Indonesia", especially when local British authorities did not recognize Indonesia as an independent government.

=== National news agency ===
After the Dutch relinquished all of their possessions in the Indies in 1962, the Indonesian government began mobilizing the mass media in its efforts to build a unified nation. President Sukarno released an executive decree which reorganized Antara as the National News Agency Institute (Lembaga Kantor Berita Nasional, or LKBN) under increased government control. Within three weeks of its reorganization on 24 September, the reorganized Antara became a supercorporation with its merger with other existing news agencies: the Indonesian Press Bureau (PIA), the Asian Press Board (APB), and the Indonesian National Press and Publicity Service (INPS).

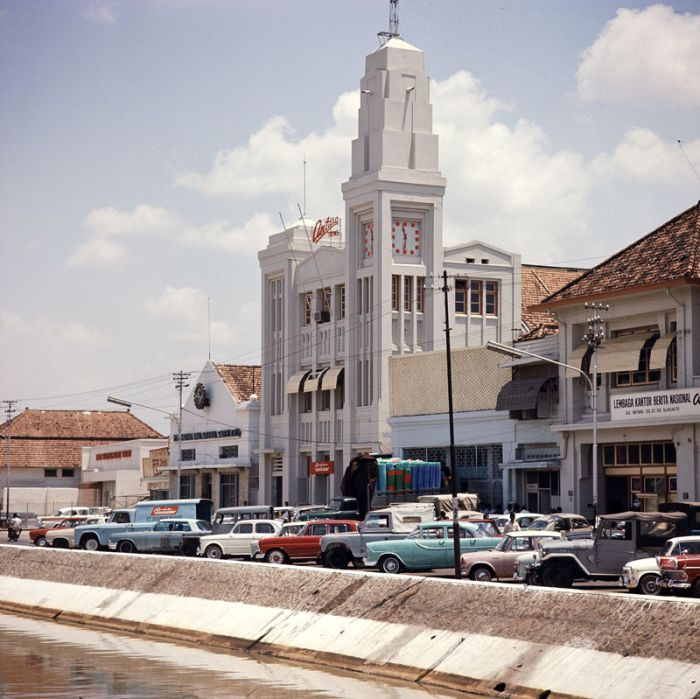
Antara office in Jakarta, 1971

Antara received financial assistance from the government and was placed directly under the president's control, giving him the authority to appoint the agency's managing director and editor-in-chief. Antara's position in the structure of government resulted in confusion over its ownership and control, as well as shifting editorial views in the coming decades. As Sukarno pursued increasingly leftist policies, the conservative media accused Antara for its "explicitly partisan" reporting. Following his removal from office, the subsequent government also used the agency to further its policies, prompting criticism from the liberal media.

An abortive coup in 1965, blamed on the Communist Party of Indonesia and its allies, left Antara under command of the Indonesian National Armed Forces. Nearly one-third of its editorial staff were dismissed, and many journalists sympathetic to the Communist Party were killed in the subsequent anti-communist purge. After Suharto assumed the presidency in the following year, the agency produced many of its news reports based on official government sources. Independent news outlets published stories on politically sensitive topics only if they had been reported by Antara in order to avoid sanctions should the stories be found offensive by government leaders. Although the government released a decree affirming freedom of the press, news publishers had to obtain a Permit To Publish (Surat Izin Terbit) from the Ministry of Information and a Permit To Print (Surat Izin Cetak) from the military security authority Kopkamtib. This ensured the suppression of publications with militant views.

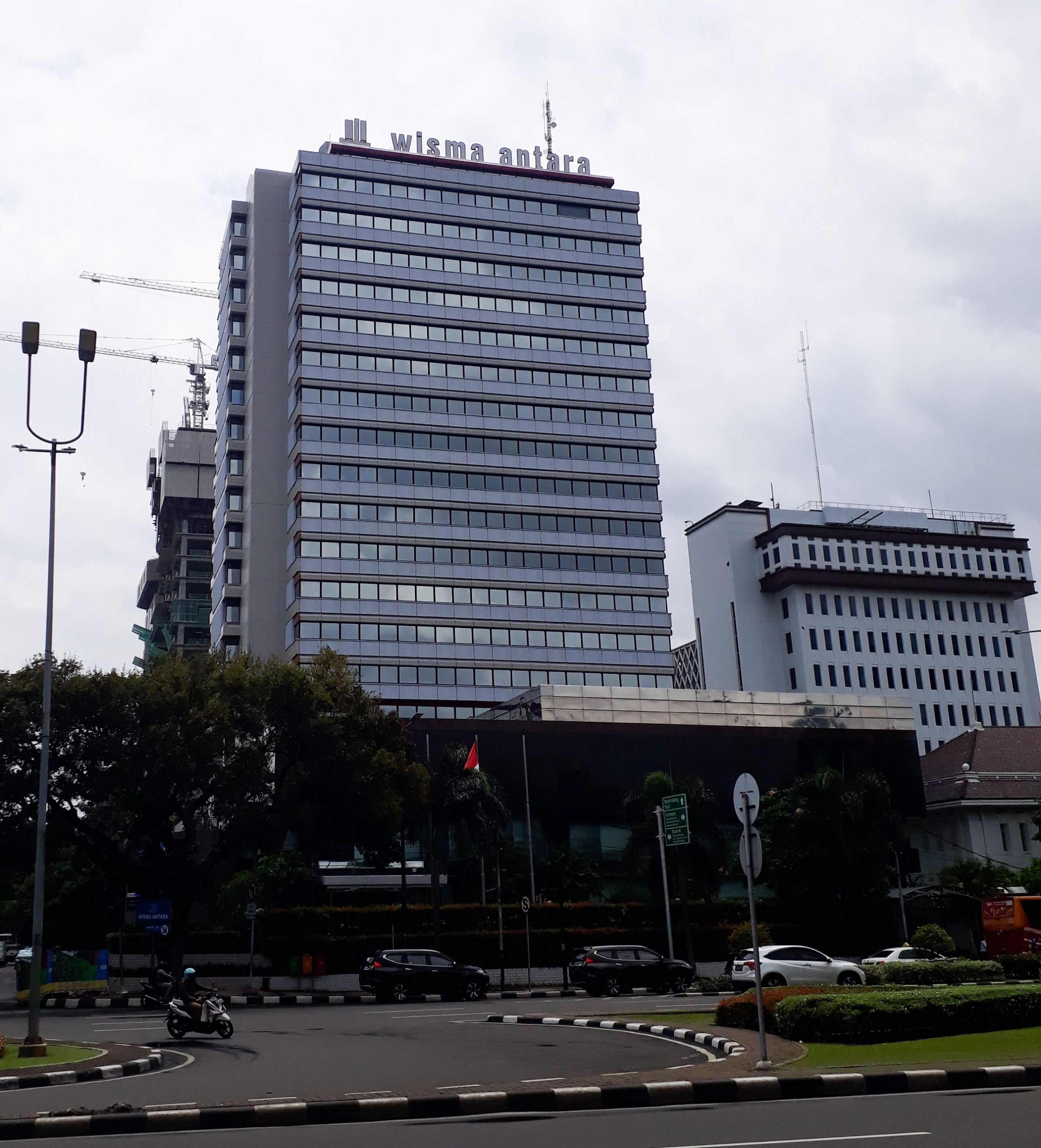
Wisma Antara in Central Jakarta, where Antara was headquartered from its opening in 1981 through 2023. BSI Tower currently replaces the building.

Suharto resigned his presidency in 1998, and licensing requirements for media organizations were lifted the following September as the number of authorized publications surged from 289 to over 2,000 in the span of 16 months. Antara attempted to reinvent its image into that of an independent news agency amid the wave of political reforms, but there were allegations of continued bias toward the policies of Suharto's successor B. J. Habibie. President Abdurrahman Wahid later sacked the agency's managing director, Parni Hadi, and accused him of "dominating the news agency and trying to turn Antara into his private company". Hadi's replacement, appointed to the post without any journalism experience, was specifically tasked to make the agency more independent.

In 2007, Antara was removed from the control of the presidency and reorganized as a statutory corporation. It had experienced financial losses in recent years and sought a Rp 450 billion (US$ 50 million) bailout from the government in the following year in order to modernize the agency's business capabilities with the goal of becoming an independent business entity.

== Operations ==
Antara is a state-owned enterprise (Badan Usaha Milik Negara) under the Ministry of State Owned Enterprises. It was previously under direct presidential authority since 1962 and within the administrative structure of the State Secretariat, which provided for its subsidies, since 1977. The news agency was also responsible to Ministry of Information which coordinated press activities. David Hill of Murdoch University points out that under the Suharto government Antara's Supervisory Council at one point included the deputy chief of the State Intelligence Coordinating Agency, indicating military interest in regulating the press. Antara's status as a government entity had come into question as restrictions on press activity were lifted. Article 9 of the Law of the Republic of Indonesia No. 40 of 1999 stipulates that news organizations must operate as a "legal entity", which directly contradicted Antara's status as an institute according to former executive editor A. J. Muaya. (Note: Article 9 of Law of the Republic of Indonesia No. 40 of 1999 uses the term "badan hukum". Romano & Seinor (2005, p. 118) argue, "Although the organization collects almost all of its revenue through commercial activities, Antara cannot separate itself from the state completely by becoming a limited company." Antara's formal name reflected its status as an institute (lembaga) rather than a company (perusahaan).)

Government subsidy accounted for 11 percent of Antara's operational costs in 1987–88. This figure had fallen to 1 percent by 2002, with an additional 25 percent of income coming from the sale of its wire services to domestic news organizations. A 1972 decree by the Ministry of Information stipulates that Antara is the only news organization permitted to distribute news material from foreign news agencies. This results in an effective monopoly that provides the largest source of the agency's revenues. Some government officials have called for an end to this practice, but Angela Romano and Blythe Senior of Queensland University of Technology point out that such a decision will "undermine Antara's entire operating structure" and compromise the agency's financial stability. The Jakarta Post reported in 2000 that some 70 domestic news organizations were subscribed to the agency's wire service.

== Partnerships ==
Antara has been a longtime distributor of English-language news from Agence France-Presse. In 2011, the two news agencies finalised an agreement to jointly launch multimedia services in Bahasa Indonesia.

Antara has had a memorandum of understanding (MoU) in place with Turkish state-run outlet Anadolu Agency for the purposes of boosting professional collaboration between the two agencies as well as regularly exchanging content on regional and global developments.

Antara has partnership agreements in place with Chinese state media outlets Xinhua News Agency and China Global Television Network to repost their content.

== Public response and opinion ==
Antara's legacy as a news organization is the documentation of Indonesia's decolonization process and formative years as a nation. Antara became an alternative news source for the fledgling Indonesian press which could not afford the services of its rival Aneta, and nationalist interpretations in its reporting contrasted that of the Dutch news agency. Despite these advances, political scientist Oey Hong Lee observed that the overall impact of Antara's reporting remained limited while Aneta continued to exist, "reflecting on the weakness of the nationalist press" and with "[Antara's] predominantly home-based news coverage finding its way only into more nationalist minded newspapers and progressive Chinese press organs".

Hill argues that journalists and guerrilla soldiers were equally important in winning the Indonesian National Revolution. Antara and nationalist newspapers, which were largely unrestricted under the postwar transitional Allied administration, engaged in a war of propaganda in order to gain international recognition of an independent Indonesia. On the occasion of the agency's 69th anniversary, President Susilo Bambang Yudhoyono stated, "Antara made immense contributions in documenting the nation's struggle during the period of revolution, such that its role must not be forgotten." (Note: Original: "Peran Antara di era perjuangan dulu sangat besar dalam mewartakan perjuangan bangsa ini sehingga tidak boleh dilupakan.")

In the 1960s, the Antara Agency's monopoly as the sole provider of news was broken. The Indonesian National Armed Forces, whose growing sociopolitical involvement in the 1950s resulted in a "triangular power structure" with President Sukarno and the Communist Party of Indonesia, grew wary of Antara's leftist leaning under government management. Under then Chief of Staff and Minister of Defense General Abdul Haris Nasution, it responded by establishing the Armed Forces Information Centre (Pusat Pemberitaan Angkatan Bersendjata, PPAB) in 1965 to disseminate the policies and views of the National Armed Forces. The Armed Forces Information Centre, staffed by personnel of the armed forces, became a tool in the struggle against the Communists in the aftermath of the 30 September Movement coup attempt of 1965 and when Suharto assumed the presidency, it became a partner in helping implement dwifungsi in the press, becoming a partner of Antara while continuing its mission to the forces. A consortium of newspapers also sought to establish an unaffiliated news agency in 1966 when it formed the KNI Foundation (Jajasan Kantorberita Nasional Indonesia), but staff and resources were limited compared to Antara, which received government funding. Both agencies had ceased operations by 2001.

Romano and Senior argue that Antara's relationship with the government puts the agency at risk of engaging in self-censorship in recent years. Internal reforms immediately after 1998 did not eliminate the culture of cronyism that had come to characterize the relationship between the government and the press. The two note, however, that Antara journalists were given greater rights to affiliate and organize into unions than their peers in other news organizations.

== See also ==
- Mass media in Indonesia
- Televisi Republik Indonesia (TVRI), the public television network
- Radio Republik Indonesia (RRI), the public radio network
