= Rosihan Anwar =

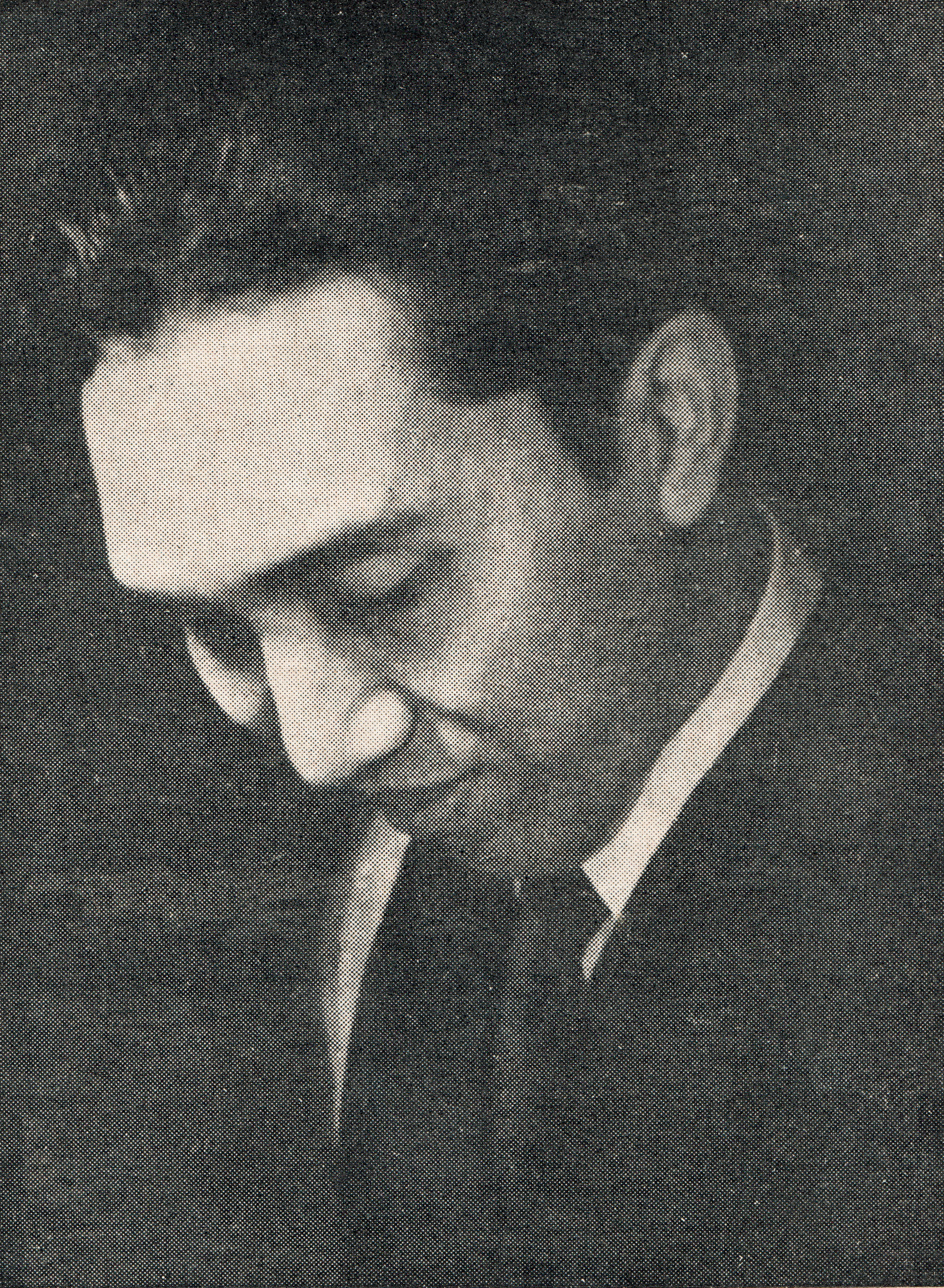
- Anwar, c. 1955
- Born: 10 May 1922; Kubang Nan Dua, Sumatra's West Coast, Dutch East Indies
- Died: 14 April 2011 (aged 88); Jakarta, Indonesia
- Occupations: journalist, editor, actor
- Notable credit(s): Siasat magazine and Pedoman newspaper, several books

Rosihan Anwar (10 May 1922 – 14 April 2011) was a renowned Indonesian journalist and author.

Rosihan Anwar was born in Kubang Nan Dua, West Sumatra. Rosihan received his early education at HIS and MULO in Padang. He continued his studies at Algemene Middelbare School (AMS) in Yogyakarta and often participated in journalism workshops at Columbia University, New York. His career began as reporter in Asia Raja newspaper during the Japanese invasion of Indonesia. In 1947, he founded Siasat magazine. He was also the founder and editor of Pedoman newspaper, which was twice forcibly closed by Sukarno regime (1961) and Suharto's New Order administration (1974), because of its vocal criticism of the authoritarian regime.

Rosihan also acted in several movies such as Lagi-lagi Krisis (Crisis Again), Karmila, and Tjoet Nja' Dien.

Rosihan Anwar was not interested in power, but was more a man of conscience and culture. He wrote critiques in local and foreign media. He was one of the founders of the National Film Company (Perfani). He was well known as a writer, and published 30 books and wrote hundreds of articles, mostly in Indonesian. The last book he wrote, Petite Histoire Indonesia, is about Indonesian history.

He also translated Jose Rizal's poem My Last Farewell into Indonesian, and it was recited by the soldiers of Indonesian independence before going to battle.

Rosihan Anwar died in Jakarta on 14 April 2011, of heart failure due to old age.
