= Pedoman =

Pedoman (Guide) was an Indonesian daily newspaper. It was the main organ of the Socialist Party of Indonesia. Rosihan Anwar was the editor of the paper. As of 1960, it had a daily circulation of around 53,000.
