= List of members of the Indonesian House of Representatives (1956–1959) =

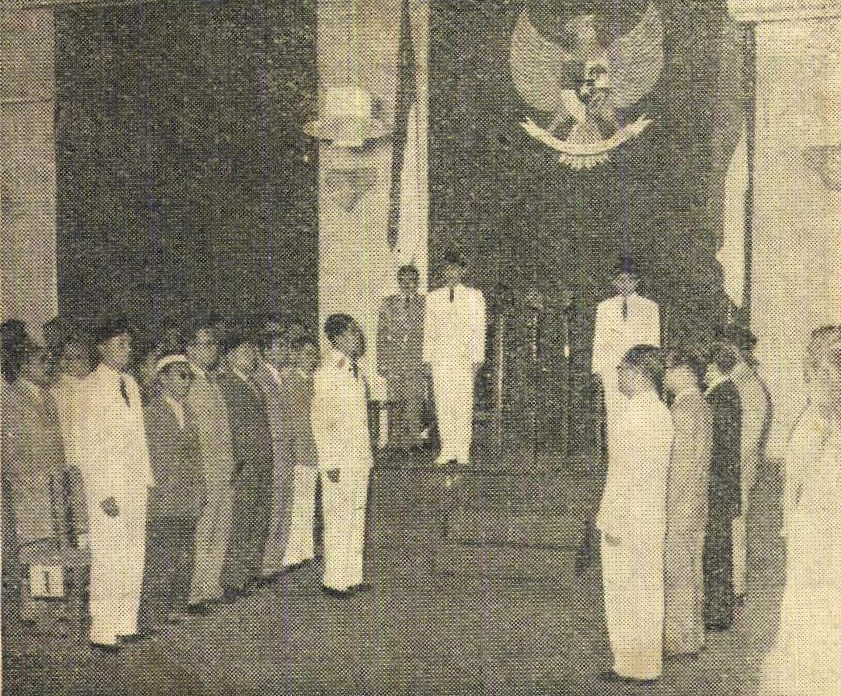
The dissolution of the Provisional House of Representatives and the inauguration of the House of Representatives for the 1956–1959 period, 20 September 1956

The following article lists the members of the Indonesian House of Representatives for the 1956–1959 period. Its membership consisted of 257 members elected in the 1955 Indonesian legislative election and 15 members appointed as representatives of ethnic minorities and Papua, which was then under the control of the Netherlands.

== Composition ==
Fractions in the house consisted of two types: single-party fractions (marked in green) and multi-party fractions (marked in yellow).

Fraction name	Elected members	Appointed members	Total members
Indonesian National Party	57	1	58
Masyumi Party	57	3	60
Nahdlatul Ulama	45	2	47
Communist Party of Indonesia	32	0	32
National Progressive	11: Murba (2); Baperki (1); Permai (1); Acoma (1); Grinda (1); PIR-Wongsonegoro (1); Soedjono Prawirosoedarso (1)	0	11
Indonesian Islamic Union Party	8	0	8
Indonesian Christian Party	8	1	9
Catholic	7: Catholic Party (6); Dayak Unity Party (1)	1	8
Proclamation Supporter	6: Labor Party (2); PRI (2); PRIM (1); PRD (1)	0	6
Development	7	0	7
Indonesian Socialist Party	5	0	5
Islamic Education Movement	4	0	4
League of Supporters of Indonesian Independence	4	1	5
Movement to Defend the Pancasila	2	0	2
Police Employee's Association of the Republic of Indonesia	2	0	2
Islamic Victory Force	1	0	1
Islamic Tharikah Unity Party	1	0	1
PIR-Hazairin	1	0	1
Unity	0	3	3
Independent	0	2	2
Total	257	15	272

== Leadership ==
Office	Membership Number	Constituency	Portrait	Name	Party	Refs
Speaker	1	Central Java		Sartono	PNI	
Deputy Speaker	17	South Sumatra		Zainul Arifin	NU	
Deputy Speaker	57	West Java		Arudji Kartawinata	PSII	
Deputy Speaker	11	South Sumatra		Zainal Abidin Ahmad	Masyumi	

== Elected ==
Name	Photo	Membership Number	Constituency	Fraction	Party	Notes
Abdullah Afandi		127	East Java	Nahdlatul Ulama		
Abdul Azis		112	East Java	Islamic Victory Force		
Abdul Aziz Dijar		106	East Java	Nahdlatul Ulama		
Abdul Hakim		88	North Sumatra	Masyumi		
Abdul Rasjid Faqih		138	Southeast Sulawesi/South Sulawesi	Masyumi		
Abdul Wachid Soejoso		109	East Java	Masyumi		
Abdullah Gathmyr		69	South Sumatra	Nahdlatul Ulama		
Abdulmutalib Daeng Talu		172	East Nusa Tenggara	Great Indonesia Unity Party - Hazairin		
Abdulrozak		156	South Sumatra	Indonesian National Party		Resigned on 1 June 1957.
Abdul Wahab Hasbullah		73	East Java	Nahdlatul Ulama		
Abdulhajat		55	West Java	Development	Indonesian Communist Party	Died in Jakarta on 15 September 1958
Achmad Ghozali		130	East Java	Nahdlatul Ulama		
Achmad Siddiq		131	East Java	Nahdlatul Ulama		
Achmad Sjaichu		114	East Java	Nahdlatul Ulama		
Achsien		199	East Java	Nahdlatul Ulama		
Adam Malik		84	Jakarta	Murba Party		
Ahem Erningpradja		249	West Java	Indonesian National Party		Resigned on 12 July 1959.
Muhammad Ahmad		181	West Java	Indonesian National Party		
Ahmad Dara Sjahruddin		243	Southeast Sulawesi/South Sulawesi	Masyumi		
Dipa Nusantara Aidit		256	Central Java	Indonesian Communist Party		
Muhammad Akib		144	Southeast Sulawesi/South Sulawesi	Masyumi		
Ali Akbar		15	Central Sumatra	Masyumi		
Mohammad Ali Pratamingkusumo		123	East Java	Nahdlatul Ulama		
Ali Sastroamidjojo		38	East Java	Indonesian National Party		Nonactive since 24 March 1956. Resigned on 20 June 1957.
Ambio		124	East Java	Indonesian National Party		
Amir Anwar		204	West Java	Indonesian Communist Party		Resigned on 28 November 1956.
Amung Amran		202	West Java	Indonesian National Party		
Andi Sewang Daeng Muntu		137	Southeast Sulawesi/South Sulawesi	Masyumi		
Anuarbek		170	West Nusa Tenggara	Masyumi		
Anwar Harjono		8	East Java	Masyumi		
Anwar Musaddad		227	Central Java	Nahdlatul Ulama		
Anwar Tjokroaminoto		75	South Sumatra	Indonesian Islamic Union Party		
Muhammad Anwar Zain		236	East Java	Masyumi		
Daeng Muhammad Ardiwinata		241	West Java	League of Supporters of Indonesian Independence		
Ardiwinangun		179	West Java	Masyumi		
Arudji Kartawinata		57	West Java	Indonesian Islamic Union Party		
Asmah Sjachrunie		239	South Kalimantan	Nahdlatul Ulama		
Asmuni		183	West Java	Masyumi		
Asraroedin		87	West Java	Proclamation Supporter	Labor Party	
Hussein Saleh Assegaff		139	South Sulawesi/South East Sulawesi	Nahdlatul Ulama		
Emong Wiratama Astapradja		139	West Java	Proclamation Supporter	Village People's Union	
Atmodarminto		216	Central Java	National Progressive	Grindra	
Ahmad Balja Umar		234	Central Java	Masyumi		
Muhamad Basah		198	Central Java	Police Employee's Association of the Republic of Indonesia		
Abdul Basjid		247	Central Java	Masyumi		
Soleman Dairo Bili		99	East Nusa Tenggara	Indonesian National Party		
Burhanuddin Harahap		52	Central Java	Masyumi		
Brodjotruno Maniudin		105	East Java	Nahdlatul Ulama		
A.Chamid Wijaya		21	West Nusa Tenggara	Nahdlatul Ulama		
Muhammad Dahlan		53	East Java	Nahdlatul Ulama		
Muhammad Dalijono		233	Central Java	Masyumi		
Darsono		176	West Java	Indonesian National Party		
Djadi Wirosubroto		223	Central Java	Communist Party of Indonesia		
Djadil Abdullah		158	South Sumatra	Masyumi		
Djadja Wiriasumita		189	West Java	Nahdlatul Ulama		
Tjetje Djaja Rachmat		193	West Java	Masyumi		
Syekh Haji Djalaluddin		163	Central Sumatra	Islamic Tharikah Unity Party		
Djerman Prawira Winata		180	West Java	Masyumi		
Djody Gondokusumo		64	West Java	National Progressive	National People's Party	
Muhammad Djunaidi bin Abdul Azis		56	Jakarta	Nahdlatul Ulama		
Djokosoedjono		34	Central Java	Communist Party of Indonesia		
Djumhur Hakim		175	West Nusa Tenggara	Indonesian National Party		
Djunah Pardjaman		192	West Java	Masyumi		
Doedi Soemawidjaja		185	West Java	Indonesian National Party		
Gondulphus Doeriat		229	Central Java	Catholic	Catholic Party	
Ajip Muhammad Dzuhri		37	West Java	Nahdlatul Ulama		
Muhamad Fadil Dasuki		190	West Java	Masyumi		
Fakih Usman		67	West Java	Masyumi		
Gatot Mangkoepradja		186	West Java	Movement to Defend the Pancasila		
Hadikusumo		2	Central Java	Indonesian National Party		
Hadinijah Hadi Ngabdulhadi		134	East Java	Nahdlatul Ulama		
Hafni Zahra Abu Hanifah Thaib		91	East Java	Masyumi		
Hamid Algadri		18	West Nusa Tenggara	Indonesian Socialist Party		
Mohammad Hanafiah		238	South Kalimantan	Nahdlatul Ulama		
Imam Soeparni Handoko Widjojo		128	East Java	Indonesian National Party		
Hardi		80	Jakarta	Indonesian National Party		
Hariadi Jadipranoto		219	Jakarta	National Progressive	National People's Party	
Harsono Tjokroaminoto		121	Southeast Sulawesi/South Sulawesi	Indonesian Islamic Union Party		
Hartojo Prawirosudarmo		93	West Java	Development	Indonesian Communist Party	
Hasan Basry		3	South Kalimantan	Masyumi		
Natiar Hulman Lumbantobing		12	North Sumatra	Indonesian National Party		
Hutomo Supardan		92	Central Java	Communist Party of Indonesia		
Ibnu Parna		208	West Java	National Progressive	Acoma Party	
Ido Garnida		182	West Java	Proclamation Supporter	Party of the People of Free Indonesia	
Imam Soetardjo		81	East Java	Proclamation Supporter	Labor Party	
Zakaria Imban		246	North Sulawesi/Central Sulawesi	Indonesian Islamic Union Party		
Imron Rosjadi		253	West Java	Nahdlatul Ulama		
Mohamad Isa		155	South Sumatra	Indonesian National Party		
Muhammad Isa Anshari		200	West Java	Masyumi		
Mohammad Amin Iskandar		9	West Java	Nahdlatul Ulama		
Ismail Napu		5	North Sulawesi/Central Sulawesi	Masyumi		
Ismangoen Poedjowidagdo		19	Central Java	Indonesian National Party		
Mohammad Isnaeni		254	East Java	Indonesian National Party		
Jahja Siregar		248	North Sumatra	Masyumi		
Jusuf Adjitorop		149	North Sumatra	Communist Party of Indonesia		
L.Kape		171	East Nusa Tenggara	Catholic	Catholic Party	
Ignatius Joseph Kasimo Hendrowahyono		25	East Java	Catholic	Catholic Party	
Kasman Singodimedjo		59	West Java	Masyumi		
Katamsi Sutisna Sendjaja		206	West Java	League of Supporters of Indonesian Independence		
Kiagus Alwi		169	West Nusa Tenggara	Masyumi		
Rahendro Koesnan		13	Central Java	Indonesian National Party		
Lastari Sutrasno		44	East Java	Indonesian National Party		
Johannes Leimena		65	Maluku	Indonesian Christian Party		
Muhammad Hatta Lukman		48	Central Java	Communist Party of Indonesia		
Lukas Kustaryo		242	West Java	League of Supporters of Indonesian Independence		
Mahmudah Mawardi		85	Central Java	Nahdlatul Ulama		
Manai Sophiaan		27	Southeast Sulawesi/South Sulawesi	Indonesian National Party		
Sarmidi Mangunsarkoro		33	Central Java	Indonesian National Party		
Entol Muhammad Mansjur		203	West Java	Indonesian National Party		
Mansoer Daoed Datuk Palimo Kayo		160	Central Sumatra	Masyumi		
Ida Bagus Putra Manuaba		41	West Nusa Tenggara	Indonesian National Party		
Mariam Kanta Sumpena		195	Central Java	Nahdlatul Ulama		
Ma'rifat Mardjani		159	Central Sumatra	Islamic Education Movement		
Marijamah Djunaedi		207	East Java	Nahdlatul Ulama		
Masjhur Azhari		154	South Sumatra	Masyumi		
Masjhur Rifai		97	West Kalimantan	Masyumi		
Masjkur		50	East Java	Nahdlatul Ulama		
D. S. Matakupan		89	East Nusa Tenggara	Catholic	Catholic Party	
Mawardi Noor		150	North Sumatra	Masyumi		
Memet Tanumidjaja		201	East Java	Police Employee's Association of the Republic of Indonesia		
Misbach		110	East Java	Masyumi		
Moedawari		111	East Java	Nahdlatul Ulama		
Moedikdio		26	Central Java	Communist Party of Indonesia		
Gusti Abdul Moeis		60	South Kalimantan	Masyumi		
Moeljadi Notowardojo		126	East Java	Communist Party of Indonesia		
Moenadir		103	Central Java	Indonesian National Party		
Moersid Idris		96	West Kalimantan	Indonesian National Party		
Murtadji Bisri		104	East Java	Nahdlatul Ulama		
Moelisch		214	Central Java	Nahdlatul Ulama		
Christoffel Joseph Mooy		174	East Nusa Tenggara	Indonesian Christian Party		
Munir Abisudjak		83	Central Java	Nahdlatul Ulama		
Muslich		225	Central Java	Nahdlatul Ulama		
Engkin Zainal Muttaqien		188	West Java	Masyumi		
Mohammad Natsir		90	West Java	Masyumi		
Njak Diwan		153	North Sumatra	Islamic Education Movement		
Njono		252	Central Java	Communist Party of Indonesia		
Njoto		42	East Java	Communist Party of Indonesia		
Noerjahman		235	Central Java	Nahdlatul Ulama		
Mohammad Noor		142	Southeast Sulawesi/South Sulawesi	Masyumi		
Abdoel Ghani Mohammad Noor		133	East Java	Nahdlatul Ulama		
Notosukardjo		232	Central Java	Indonesian National Party		
Nungtjik bin Hadji Abdul Roni		157	South Sumatra	Communist Party of Indonesia		
A. Nunung Kusnadi		194	West Java	Indonesian Islamic Union Party		
Muhammad Nur el Ibrahimy		82	North Sumatra	Masyumi		
Osa Maliki		178	West Java	Indonesian National Party		
Franciscus Conradus Palaoensoeka		6	West Kalimantan	Catholic	Dayak Unity Party	
Pamudji		220	Central Java	Indonesian National Party		
Pandu Kartawiguna		205	West Java	National Progressive	Murba Party	
Oter Pardikin Partoadiwidjojo		230	Central Java	Indonesian Islamic Union Party		
Peris Parede		22	West Java	Communist Party of Indonesia		
Jacob Piry		167	East Java	Communist Party of Indonesia		
Poeger		129	East Java	Indonesian National Party		
Prawoto Mangkusasmito		36	Central Java	Masyumi		
Rahmah el Yunusiyah		164	Central Sumatra	Masyumi		
Boudewijn Jeremias Rambitan		10	North Sulawesi/Central Sulawesi	Indonesian National Party		
Rasjid Sutan Radja Emas		32	East Java	Indonesian National Party		
Ridwan Sjahrani		240	South Kalimantan	Nahdlatul Ulama		
Roestamadji		210	Central Java	Proclamation Supporter	Indonesian People's Party	
Runturambi		54	East Java	Development	Communist Party of Indonesia	
Saalah Yusuf Sutan Mangkuto		161	Central Sumatra	Masyumi		
Sjafi'ie		136	East Java	Nahdlatul Ulama		
Sahar Gelar Sutan Besar		152	North Sumatra	Masyumi		
Sahlan Ridwan		224	Central Java	Nahdlatul Ulama		
Muhammad Saifuddin		140	South Sulawesi/Southeast Sulawesi	Nahdlatul Ulama		
V. B. Saka		165	East Nusa Tenggara	Catholic	Catholic Party	
Sakirman		43	Central Java	Communist Party of Indonesia		
Charlotte Salawati Daud		141	Jakarta	Communist Party of Indonesia		
Saleh Soerjoningprodjo		113	East Java	Nahdlatul Ulama		
Saleh Umar		61	North Sumatra	Indonesian National Party		
Mohammad Sardjan		70	East Java	Masyumi		
Sartono		1	Central Java	Indonesian National Party		
Sastra		191	West Java	Indonesian Socialist Party		
Selamat Ginting		148	North Sumatra	Indonesian National Party		
Semanhadi Sastrowidjojo		116	East Java	Indonesian National Party		
Huibert Senduk		143	Southeast Sulawesi/South Sulawesi	Indonesian Christian Party		
Siauw Giok Tjhan		24	Central Java	National Progressive	Consultative Council for Indonesian Citizenship	
Sidik Kertapati		58	West Java	Communist Party of Indonesia		
Singgih Tirtosoediro		39	Central Java	Communist Party of Indonesia		
Siradjuddin Abbas		14	Central Sumatra	Islamic Education Movement		
Melanchton Siregar		151	North Sumatra	Indonesian Christian Party		
Siswojo		211	Central Java	Communist Party of Indonesia		
Sjahbudin Latif		20	North Sulawesi/Central Sulawesi	Indonesian Islamic Union Party		
Saifuddin Zuhri		31	Central Java	Nahdlatul Ulama		
Sjarif Usman		78	Jakarta	Masyumi		
Soeatmadji		119	East Java	Indonesian National Party		
Soebadio Sastrosatomo		244	East Java	Indonesian Socialist Party		
Soebagio Reksodipuro		244	West Java	Indonesian National Party		
Soedarsono		79	Central Java	Indonesian National Party		
Soediman Puspowidagdo		209	Central Java	Indonesian National Party		
Soedjito		108	East Java	Communist Party of Indonesia		
Soedjono		71	East Java	Development	Communist Party of Indonesia	
Soedjono Prawirosoedarso		135	East Java	National Progressive	Soedjono Prawirosoedarso	
Soejoedi		228	East Java	Indonesian National Party		
Soekamsi Djojoadiprodjo		222	Central Java	Indonesian National Party		
Soelaeman Widjojosoebroto		197	West Java	Nahdlatul Ulama		
Soemardi Jatmosoemarto		255	Central Java	Indonesian National Party		
Soemari		218	Central Java	Indonesian National Party		
Soemitro Kolopaking		251	Central Java	League of Supporters of Indonesian Independence		
Soenardjo		250	Central Java	Nahdlatul Ulama		
Soepardi		118	East Java	Development	Communist Party of Indonesia	
Soepeni Poedjoboentoro		118	East Java	Indonesian National Party		
Soeprapto		117	East Java	Masyumi		
Soeprapto		101	East Java	Development	Communist Party of Indonesia	
Suroso Pringgosoeseno		187	West Java	Indonesian National Party		
Soesilo Prawirosoesanto		231	Central Java	Indonesian National Party		
Soetarto Hadisoedibjo		23	East Nusa Tenggara	Catholic	Catholic Party	
Soetojo Mertodimoeljo		95	East Java	Indonesian National Party		
Soetoko Djojosoebroto		226	Central Java	Indonesian National Party		
Sutomo		94	East Java	Proclamation Supporter	Indonesian People's Party	
Soewono		120	East Java	Indonesian National Party		
Mohamad Soleman		145	Maluku	Masyumi		
Manuel Sondakh		146	North Sulawesi/Central Sulawesi	Indonesian Christian Party		
I Gusti Gde Subamia		168	West Nusa Tenggara	Indonesian National Party		
Sudisman		77	East Java	Communist Party of Indonesia		
Sudjono Hardjosudiro		72	West Java	Masyumi		
Sudojo		115	East Java	Communist Party of Indonesia		
I Made Sugitha		166	West Nusa Tenggara	Indonesian Socialist Party		
Suhaimi Rachman		28	West Java	Communist Party of Indonesia		
Suhardjo		100	West Java	Indonesian Islamic Union Party		
Suharti Suwarto		51	Central Java	Communist Party of Indonesia		
Sukatno Hoeseni		40	East Java	Communist Party of Indonesia		
Soekiman Wirjosandjojo		35	Central Java	Masyumi		
Sunarjo Mangunpuspito		217	Central Java	Masyumi		
Sundari Abdulrachman		212	Central Java	Communist Party of Indonesia		
Supeno Hadisiswojo		49	East Java	Communist Party of Indonesia		
Sutijah Suryahadi		215	Central Java	Indonesian National Party		
Sutjipto		221	Central Java	Indonesian National Party		
Suzanna Hamdani		257	West Java	Indonesian Islamic Union Party		
Willem Linggi Tambing		147	Southeast Sulawesi/South Sulawesi	Indonesian Christian Party		
Albert Mangaratua Tambunan		66	North Sumatra	Indonesian Christian Party		
S.M Thaher		196	West Java	Indonesian National Party		
Teuku Mohamad Thaher Thajeb		47	North Sumatra	Communist Party of Indonesia		
Muhammad Thajib Abdullah		173	East Nusa Tenggara	Masyumi		
Tjikwan		4	South Sumatra	Masyumi		
Tjoo Tik Tjoen		4	East Java	Communist Party of Indonesia		
Tjugito		237	East Java	Communist Party of Indonesia		
Udin Sjamsudin		7	North Sumatra	Masyumi		
Umi Sardjono		86	East Java	Development	Communist Party of Indonesia	
Samadi Utarjo		62	Central Java	Communist Party of Indonesia		
Uwes Abubakar		184	West Java	Masyumi		
Muhammad Wahib Wahab		102	East Java	Nahdlatul Ulama		
Wasis		125	East Java	Indonesian National Party		
Karsono Werdojo		76	East Java	National Progressive	Indonesian Marhaen People's Union	
Wilopo		63	West Java	Indonesian National Party		
Wongsonegoro		74	Central Java	National Progressive	Great Indonesia Unity Party - Wongsonegoro	
Mohammad Yamin		29	West Java	Movement to Defend the Pancasila		
Mohammad Yunan Nasution		46	Jakarta	Masyumi		
Zainal Abidin Ahmad		11	Central Sumatra	Masyumi		
Zainal Arifin Tanamas		122	East Java	Nahdlatul Ulama		
Zainul Arifin		17	North Sumatra	Nahdlatul Ulama		

== Appointed ==
Name	Photo	Membership Number	Fraction	Notes
D. Hage		268	European Minority	
Albert Karubuy		260	Unity (representing West Irian)	
J.R. Koot		270	European Minority	
Lie Po Yoe		271	Chinese Minority	
Oei Tjeng Hien		263	Chinese Minority	
Muhammad Padang		258	Unity (representing West Irian)	
Johannes Cornelis Princen		265	European Minority	
Christoffel M. du Puy		266	European Minority	
J.L.W.R. Rhemrev		269	European Minority	
Silas Papare		259	Unity (representing West Irian)	
Tan Eng Hong		264	Chinese Minority	
Tan Kiem Liong		262	Chinese Minority	
Tjung Tin Jan		261	Chinese Minority	
E.F. Wens		267	European Minority	
Ang Tjiang Liat		272	Chinese Minority	
