= House of Representatives (Indonesia, 1956–1959) =

First elected House of Representatives in Indonesia

House of Representatives of Indonesia (1956 – 1959)
←	1950–1956	1959–1960	→
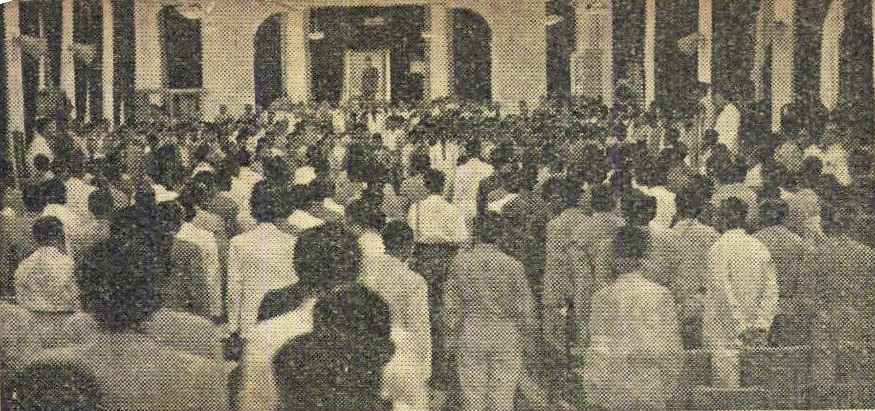
- First session of the elected House of Representatives on 26 March 1956

Overview
- Legislative body: House of Representatives
- Meeting place: DPR/MPR Building, Jakarta
- Term: 26 March 1956 – 22 July 1959
- Election: 1955 Indonesian legislative election
- Speaker: Sartono (PNI)
- Deputy Speaker: Arudji Kartawinata (PSII)
- Deputy Speaker: Zainul Arifin (NU)
- Deputy Speaker: Zainal Abidin Ahmad (Masyumi)

The 1956–1959 term of the House of Representatives of Indonesia was the first elected House of Representatives in Indonesia. The council consisted of 257 elected members and 15 appointed members.

== Election and inauguration ==
Elections for the elected members of the 1956–1959 term of the House of Representatives were held on 29 September 1955. The election results were announced on 1 March 1956, with 27 electoral contestants gaining a total of 257 seats, with the Indonesian National Party obtaining 57 seats, while 12 smaller contestants only obtained one seat each.

Most of the elected members of the 1956–1959 term of the House of Representatives were inaugurated on 24 March 1956, with the exception of:

- Njak Diwan, Nur El Ibrahimy, Rahmah El Junusiah, I Made Sugitha (27 March 1956),
- Mohammad Hanafiah, Njono (31 March 1956),
- Saleh Umar (3 April 1956),
- Imron Rosjadi (11 April 1956),
- Mohammad Isnaeni (13 April 1956),
- Soemardi Jatmosoemarto (16 April 1956),
- D. N. Aidit (11 June 1956),
- Suzanna Hamdani (29 June 1956),

The appointed members were all inaugurated at a different time, ranging from the first on 9 August 1956, and the last on 26 February 1957.

- Silas Papare, Muhammad Padang (9 August 1956)
- Albert Karubuy (24 August 1956)
- E.F. Wens, J.L.W.R. Rhemrev, D. Hage, Poncke Princen, R. Ch. M. du Puy,
  Tan Kiem Liang, Oei Tjeng Hien, Tan Eng Hong (5 December 1956)
- Tjung Tin Jan (12 December 1956)
- Lie Po Yoe, J.R. Koot (18 December 1956)
- Ang Tjiang Liat (26 February 1957)

== First session ==
The first session of the council was held on 26 March 1956, with the oldest member of the council, Soedjono Prawirosoedarso, leading the first session and became the temporary speaker of the council. During his leadership in the session, he was remarked as having continuous shivering during the session, misusing the gavel, and having difficulties in speaking. This first session was intended to elect the speakers and deputy speakers of the council.

== Leadership ==
Speaker	1st Deputy Speaker	2nd Deputy Speaker	3rd Deputy Speaker
Sartono; PNI	Zainul Arifin; NU	Arudji Kartawinata; PSII	Zainal Abidin Ahmad; Masyumi

== Fractions ==
Fractions in the council consisted of two types: single-party fractions (marked in green) and multi-party fractions (marked in yellow).

Fraction name	Elected members	Appointed members	Total members
Indonesian National Party	57	1	58
Masyumi Party	57	3	60
Nahdlatul Ulama	45	2	47
Communist Party of Indonesia	32	0	32
National Progressive (all from Java)	11: Murba (2); National People's Party; Baperki (1); Permai (1); Acoma (1); Gerinda (1); PIR-Wongsonegoro (1); R. Soedjono Prawirosudarso (independent) (1)	0	11
Indonesian Islamic Union Party	8	0	8
Indonesian Christian Party	8	1	9
Catholic	7: Catholic Party (6); Dayak Unity Party (1)	1	8
Proclamation Supporter	6: Labor Party (2); PRI (2); PRIM (1); PRD (1)	0	6
Development	7	0	7
Indonesian Socialist Party	5	0	5
Islamic Education Movement	4	0	4
League of Supporters of Indonesian Independence	4	1	5
Movement to Defend the Pancasila	2	0	2
Police Employee's Association of the Republic of Indonesia	2	0	2
Islamic Victory Force	1	0	1
Islamic Tharikah Unity Party	1	0	1
PIR-Hazairin	1	0	1
Unity	0	3	3
Independent	0	2	2
Total	257	15	272

The Development Fraction (Indonesian: Fraksi Pembangunan) was formed by seven independents elected on Communist Party of Indonesia tickets.

== Major events ==
- 24 March 1956: Formation of the Second Ali Sastroamidjojo Cabinet.
- 21 April 1956: The House of Representatives passed a law to officially repeal the results of the Dutch–Indonesian Round Table Conference.
- 30 November 1956: The House of Representatives approved Mohammad Hatta's plan to resign from his vice presidency.
- 1 December 1956: Vice President Mohammad Hatta officially resigns from his office.
- 12 December 1956: First report by the government to the House of Representatives regarding the Revolutionary Government of the Republic of Indonesia.
- 22 December 1956: Colonel Maludin Simbolon declared Sumatra as in a state of war.
- 21 January 1957: Second report by the government to the House of Representatives regarding the Revolutionary Government of the Republic of Indonesia.
- 21 February 1957 : President Sukarno delivered a speech about his attempts to "save the country". The speech is named as the President's Conception
- 14 March 1957: The Second Ali Sastroamidjojo Cabinet resigns.
- 2 April 1957: Suwirjo returned his mandate to the president after failing to form a new cabinet.
- 9 April 1957: Formation of the Djuanda Cabinet.
- 29 November 1957: An ad hoc committee, named as the Committee of Nine, was formed to reunite Sukarno and Mohammad Hatta.
- 14 March 1958: After delivering its second report, the Committee of Nine was dissolved.
- 23 October 1958: The House of Representatives passed a resolution to fully support the integration of the West Irian territory into Indonesia.
- 2 March 1959: The Djuanda Cabinet delivers its decision to dissolve the Constitutional Assembly of Indonesia to the House of Representatives.
- 5 July 1959: President Sukarno officially dissolved the Constitutional Assembly of Indonesia with the presidential decree.
- 22 July 1959: The House of Representatives for the 1956–1959 term is officially dissolved and replaced with the Transitional House of Representatives.

== Works ==
=== Statistics ===
Type	Amount	Approved	Rejected	Withdrawn	Incomplete
Bills	145	113	0	16	16
Initiatives	8	3	0	4	1
Motions	8	2	1	5	0
Resolutions	37	23	2	12	0
Interpelations	8	3	0	3	0
Inquiries	0	0	0	0	1

=== Major legislations ===
- 16 August 1956: Law No. 15 of 1956 about the formation of the autonomous region of West Irian
- 18 December 1956: Law No. 26 of 1956 about the membership of Indonesia in the United Nations
- 31 December 1956: Law No. 32 of 1956 about the balance between the central government and the regional government in the financial regulations
- 11 January 1958: Law No. 2 of 1958 about the Sino-Indonesian Dual Nationality Treaty
- 27 March 1958: Law No. 13 of 1958 about the war reparations between the Indonesian and the Japanese government
- 27 December 1958: Law No. 85 of 1958 about the Five-Year Development Plan for 1956-1960
