= 1955 Indonesian Constitutional Assembly election =

- 15 December 1955
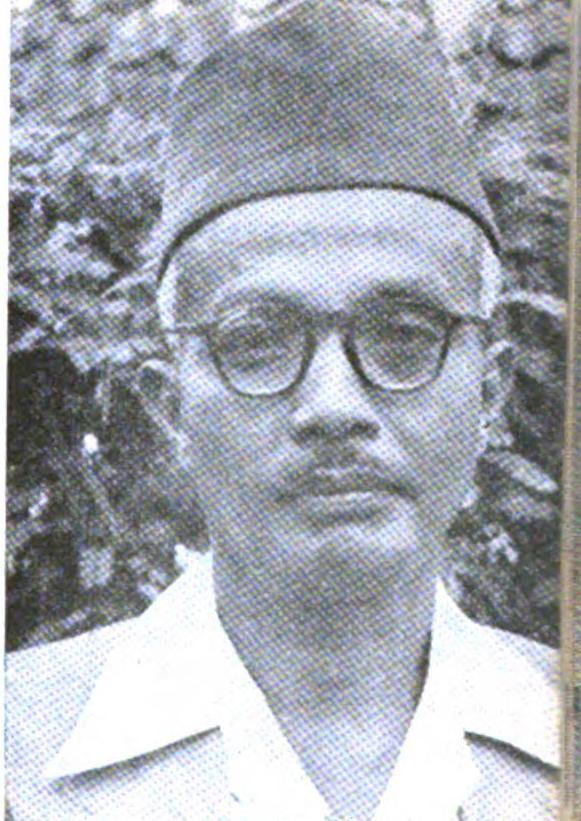

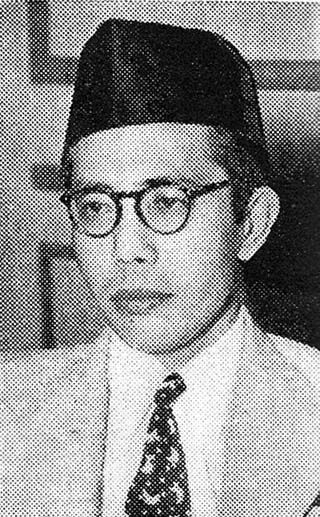

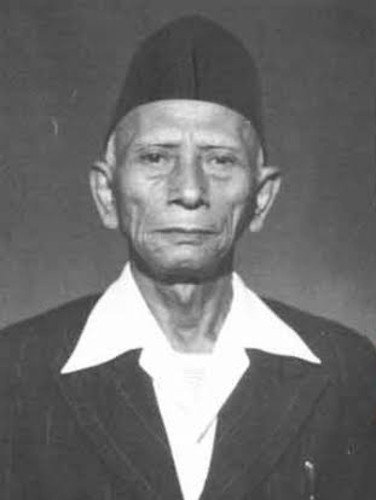

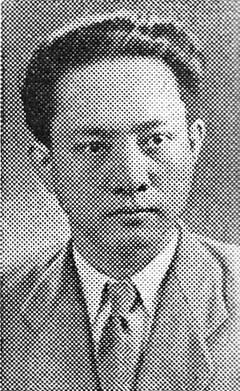
	First party	Second party
Leader	Ki Sarmidi Mangunsarkoro	Mohammad Natsir
Party	PNI	Masyumi
Seats won	119	112
Popular vote	9,070,218	7,789,619
Percentage	23.97%	20.59%
	Third party	Fourth party
Leader	Abdul Wahab Hasbullah	D.N. Aidit
Party	NU	PKI
Seats won	91	80
Popular vote	6,989,333	6,232,512
Percentage	18.47%	16.47%
Elected Speaker
Wilopo
PNI

Elections were held in Indonesia on 15 December 1955 to elect all 514 members of the Constitutional Assembly. The Provisional Constitution of 1950 had provided for the establishment of an elected body to draw up a permanent constitution following Indonesia's independence from the Netherlands. In April 1953, the House of Representatives passed the election bill. The elections for the house were set for September 1955, while those for the Constitutional Assembly were held three months later.

== Results ==
Party	Votes	%	Seats
Indonesian National Party	9,070,218	23.97	119
Masyumi Party	7,789,619	20.59	112
Nahdlatul Ulama	6,989,333	18.47	91
Communist Party of Indonesia	6,232,512	16.47	80
Indonesian Islamic Union Party	1,059,922	2.80	16
Indonesian Christian Party	988,810	2.61	16
Catholic Party	748,591	1.98	10
Socialist Party of Indonesia	695,932	1.84	10
League of Supporters of Indonesian Independence	544,803	1.44	8
Islamic Education Movement	465,359	1.23	7
Labour Party	332,047	0.88	5
Murba Party	248,633	0.66	4
National People's Party	220,652	0.58	3
Police Employee's Association of the Republic of Indonesia	179,346	0.47	3
Dayak Unity Party	169,222	0.45	3
Permai	164,386	0.43	2
Great Indonesia Unity Party–Wongsonegoro	162,420	0.43	2
Consultative Council for Indonesian Citizenship	160,456	0.42	2
Indonesian Movement	157,976	0.42	2
Movement to Defend the Pancasila	152,892	0.40	2
Party of the People of Free Indonesia	143,907	0.38	2
Indonesia People's Party	134,011	0.35	2
Great Indonesia Unity Party–Hazairin	101,509	0.27	2
Islamic Victory Force	84,862	0.22	1
Islamic Tharikah Unity Party	74,913	0.20	1
Acoma Party	55,844	0.15	1
Gerekan Banteng RI	39,874	0.11	1
Village People's Party	39,278	0.10	1
R. Soedjono Prawirosoedarso & Associates	38,356	0.10	1
Gerakan Pilihan Sunda	35,035	0.09	1
Great Indonesia Unity Party–Nusa Tenggara	33,823	0.09	1
Raja Keprabon and Associates	33,660	0.09	1
L.M. Idrus Effendi	31,988	0.08	1
Partai Tani Indonesia	30,060	0.08	1
Other parties	426,856	1.13	0
Total	37,837,105	100.00	514
Source: General Election Commission

== Sources ==
- Feith, Herbert (2008) [1962]. The Decline of Constitutional Democracy in Indonesia. Singapore: Equininox Publishing (Asia) Pte Ltd. ISBN 978-979-3780-45-0.
- Ricklefs, M.C. (2008) [1981]. A History of Modern Indonesia Since c.1300 (4th ed.). London: MacMillan. ISBN 978-0-230-54685-1.
- Sekretariat Jenderal KPU (2010). Pemuilu untuk Pemula: Modul 1 (PDF). Komisi Pemilihan Umum. Archived from the original (PDF) on 10 December 2018.
- MPR General Secretary (2006). People's Consultative Assembly, Republic of Indonesia. history, reality, and dynamics. Sekretariat Jenderal, Majelis Permusyawaratan Rakyat, Republik Indonesia.

== See also ==
- 1955 Indonesian legislative election
