= Indonesian Socialist Youth =

- Pemuda Sosialis Indonesia
- Flag of Pesindo
- Active: 10 November 1945 – 12 November 1950
- Country: Indonesia
- Role: Paramilitary Force
- Size: 300,000 (in 1947)
- Garrison/HQ: Madiun (1945‒1946); Solo (1946‒1950)
- Nickname(s): Pesindo
- Colors: Red & White
- Engagements: Indonesian National Revolution

Commanders
- Chairmans: Sutan Sjahrir; Amir Sjarifuddin

The Indonesian Socialist Youth (Indonesian: Pemuda Sosialis Indonesia, Pesindo) was a youth-based paramilitary organisation that embraced the principles of socialism to uphold the Republic of Indonesia based on popular sovereignty. Pesindo was particularly closely associated with youth leaders in 1945. The role of youth figures such as Wikana and Chaerul Saleh (Menteng 31 Group and Kaigun Group which later merged into API Jakarta), Soemarsono and Krissubanu (PRI Surabaya), Ibnu Parna (AMRI Semarang) and other figures shaped Pesindo's identity, namely a revolutionary youth organisation against colonialism and fascism.

== Background ==
On 10 November 1945, the first All-Indonesian Youth Congress was held in Yogyakarta. The event was the initiative of Minister of Information Amir Sjarifuddin, who was then active in the Socialist Party with Sutan Sjahrir. Initially, the purpose of this congress was to unite all youth organisations in Indonesia in one place to fight against colonialism.

On the other hand, Amir Sjarifuddin had another goal, which was to incorporate the support of the youth in the Socialist Party that he led. This can be seen in the dualism of Sjahrir and Amir Sjariffuddin's leadership in the Socialist Party, where Sjahrir focused more on top-level efforts, such as diplomacy, while Amir Sjarifuddin moved more to seek the support of youth leaders who had become active since the Japanese occupation.

In the end, the first Indonesian Youth Congress resulted in a decision to form an organisation called the Indonesian Youth Congress Agency (BKPRI). BKPRI consisted of all youth organisations that attended the congress. The first Chairman of BKPRI was Chaerul Saleh, assisted by Vice Chairman I Soepardo, Vice Chairman II A. Buchari, Chairman of the Struggle Leadership Council Soemarsono, and Chairman of the Development Leadership Council Wikana.

A total of 28 youth organisations joined BKPRI. In addition, there were seven youth groups that decided to fuse into a youth organisation called Pemuda Sosialis Indonesia (Pesindo). The seven youth organisations included:

- Indonesian Youth Force,
- Angkatan Muda Republik Indonesia,
- Indonesian Republican Movement,
- Youth of the Republic of Indonesia,
- Railway Youth Force,
- Gas and Electricity Youth Force,
- Post, Telegraph and Telephone Youth Force.

== Organizational identity and structure ==
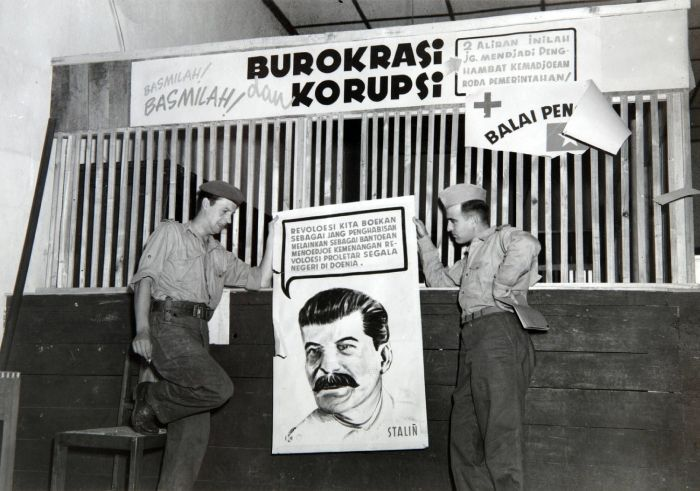
Dutch soldiers holding a poster of Stalin at the office of the Pemuda Sosialis Indonesia

Pesindo has a white star on a red background. The white colour of the star symbolises pure and holy ideals, while the red colour as the background symbolises the spirit of the people. In addition, Pesindo also has a march, the blood of the people. When in action in the field, Pesindo members also have their own code as a sign of identity. They gave a greeting using their left hand with five fingers clenched. The left hand is used as a symbol of the left movement, and the five clenched fingers symbolise the spirit and support for the five P's of Unity between youth, population, soldiers, civil servants, and police (Indonesian: Persatuan antara pemuda, penduduk, prajurit, pamong praja, dan polisi); and anti-five P's of oppression, extortion, colonisation, hostility, disruption (Indonesian: penindasan, pemerasan, penjajahan, perusuhan, pengacauan).

In late 1945 and early 1946, Pesindo's organisational structure consisted of bodies under the Council of Leaders or DPP Pesindo, which was based in Madiun. Krissubanu was the first chairman of Pesindo, with Wikana as his deputy. On 11 January 1946, Pesindo held its first congress in Yogyakarta. In this congress, it was decided that the Pesindo DPP would move from Madiun to Solo and the chairman of Pesindo was Sudisman. Amir Sjarifuddin in the congress was also decided as an advisory board or consul body.Pesindo Congress II was held in Malang on 7‒9 November 1946. In the congress it was decided that Ruslan Widjajasastra would be the general leader, Wikana as Deputy General Leader I, Roedhito as Deputy General Leader II, and Soebroto and Djalaloeddin Jusuf Nasution as Secretaries.

== Dissolution of Pesindo and the founding of Pemuda Rakyat ==
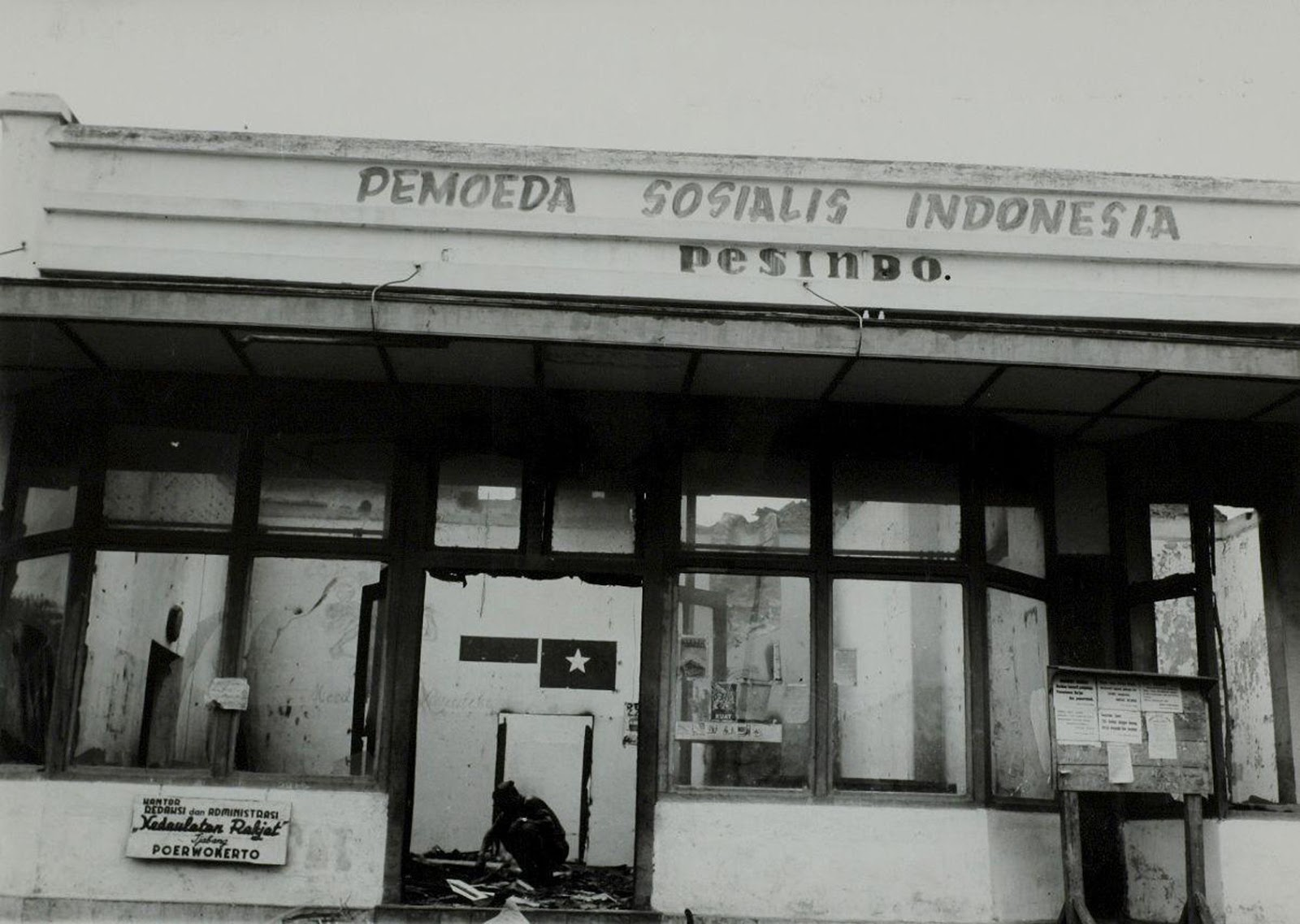
Remains of the Pesindo regional office at Purwokerto; set on fire during Operation Product

After the Madiun affair, Pesindo lost most of its political power, its army, and its leaders. If the PKI lost Musso who was shot dead by the army on 31 October 1948, Pesindo lost Amir Sjarifuddin and other figures. On 15 October 1948, BKPRI held its congress to address the Madiun Incident, which involved many youth armies. One of the congress resolutions was that BKPRI officially suspended Pesindo for its involvement in the Madiun incident. After the Madiun incident, the chairman of Pesindo was Ir. Setiadi. As a result of the suspension, Pesindo was not invited to participate in the Third All-Indonesian Youth Congress held in Yogyakarta on 14‒18 August 1949.

On 4‒12 November 1950, Pesindo held its third congress in Jakarta. The resolution adopted by this congress was that Pesindo would change its name to Pemuda Rakyat, and appointed Ir. Setiadi as General Leader I, Francisca Fanggidaej as General Leader II, Baharudin as General Leader III, and Asmudji, Sukatno, and Iskandar Subekti as General Secretaries I, II, and III. Thus, Pesindo officially disappeared from the Indonesian political scene and was replaced by the People's Youth Organisation.
