= Sobri =

Sobri may refer to:

== People ==
- Jóska Sobri (1810–1837), Hungarian outlaw
- Syamim Alif Sobri (born 1993), Malaysian footballer

== Other uses ==
- "Sobri (notre destin)", a song by French singer Leslie
- Sobri, Valandovo, North Macedonia
- Sentral Organisasi Buruh Republik Indonesia, a defunct Indonesian trade union
