= Ida Bagus Putra Manuaba =

Indonesian politician and chess player

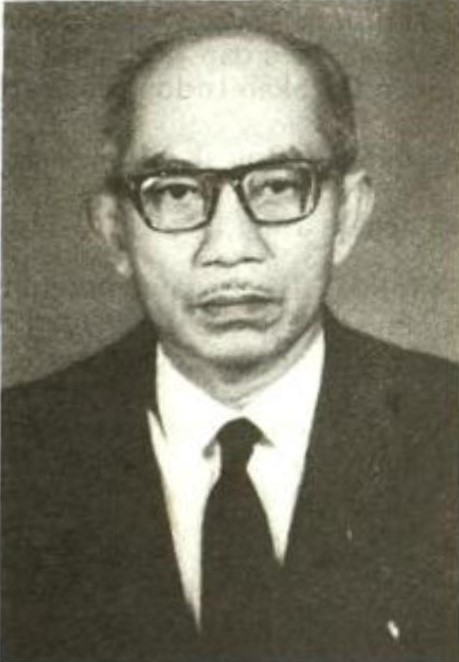
- Official portrait, c. 1970s

Member of the People's Representative Council from Bali
- In office 4 March 1956 – 1 October 1977

Member of the Constitutional Assembly of Indonesia
- In office 4 March 1956 – 5 July 1959

Personal details
- Born: 16 March 1965 Tabanan, Bali, Indonesia
- Died: c. 1980s
- Party: PNI
- Education: Hogere Kweekschool

Ida Bagus Putra Manuaba (15 February 1908 – c. 1980s) was an Indonesian teacher and politician who served as a member of the People's Representative Council and the Constitutional Assembly of Indonesia as a member of the Indonesian National Party (PNI) representing Jembrana, Bali.

He was born February 15, 1908, in Tabanan, Bali. He attended the Hogere Kweekschool, and graduated in what was the equivalent of high school. He was active in a number of organizations, including the Bali Agricultural Association and the Office Community Education. In 1925, he participated in the national awakening, becoming a member of Jong Java. He would go on to teach and become a principal at a school from 1932 until the Japanese invasion in 1942. During the Japanese occupation, detained by the Japanese, for "inciting rebellion against Japan."

When the Dutch returned following the end of World War II, he was also detained by the Netherlands Indies Civil Administration. Following the end of the National Revolution, he was elected as a member of People's Representative Council and the Constitutional Assembly in the 1955 legislative and constitutional election.

He remained as a member of the Constitutional Assembly until the assembly's dissolution in 1959, and a member of People's Representative Council until his retirement in 1977.
