= East Java (electoral district) =

Former electoral district in Indonesia (1955–2004)

East Java Jawa Timur
- Former electoral constituency for the House of Representatives
- Province: East Java
- Population: 17,950,818 (1955); 34,569,400 (1999)
- Electorate: 10,961,181 (1955); 21,811,625 (1999)

Former constituency
- Created: 1955
- Abolished: 2004
- Seats: 58 (1955) (Note: The number of seats won in the East Java electoral district actually increased to 63 as a result of the electoral system used in the 1955 elections.); 68 (1999)
- Replaced by: 11 electoral districts: List: East Java I; East Java II; East Java III; East Java IV; East Java V; East Java VI; East Java VII; East Java VIII; East Java IX; East Java X; East Java XI

East Java (Indonesian: Jawa Timur) was an electoral district (daerah pemilihan) in Indonesia used to elect members of the House of Representatives. When the constituency was first created for the 1955 elections, it had an electorate of more than 10 million people and was allocated 58 seats. By the time of the 1999 elections, its electorate had grown to more than 20 million people and it was allocated 68 seats. The constituency's boundaries corresponded to the province of East Java.

== History ==
In the 1955 elections, the constituency saw the "big four" parties—the Indonesian National Party (PNI), Masyumi Party, Nahdlatul Ulama (NU), and the Communist Party of Indonesia (PKI)—emerge as the largest parties, resulting in a four-way division. Meanwhile, the district also saw a very even combined result between the non-religious parties and Islamic parties, with the former receiving 46.6% of the vote and the latter receiving 45.75% of the vote.

== Election results ==
=== 1955 ===
Party	Votes	%	Seats
Nahdlatul Ulama	3,370,554	34.13	20
Communist Party of Indonesia	2,299,602	23.28	14
Indonesian National Party	2,251,069	22.79	14
Masyumi Party	1,109,742	11.24	7
Indonesian People's Party	100,076	1.01	1
Islamic Victory Force	78,281	0.79	1
Socialist Party of Indonesia	59,093	0.60	1
Indonesian Marhaen People's Union	54,148	0.55	1
Labour Party	51,333	0.52	1
Police Employees' Association	48,333	0.49	1
Soedjono Prawirosoedarso	47,191	0.48	1
Catholic Party	13,976	0.14	1
Others	393,100	3.98	0
Total	9,876,498	100.00	63
Total votes	9,876,498	–	
Registered voters/turnout	10,961,181	90.10	
Source: General Elections Commission

=== 1971 ===
Party	Votes	%	Seats
Functional Groups	6,843,977	54.91	35
Nahdlatul Ulama	4,382,607	35.17	22
Indonesian National Party	622,746	5.00	3
Indonesian Muslims' Party	339,919	2.73	2
Indonesian Islamic Union Party	154,707	1.24	1
Others	118,961	0.95	0
Total	12,462,917	100.00	63
Total votes	12,462,917	–	
Registered voters/turnout	13,285,676	93.81	
Source: General Elections Commission
