= Jacob Piry =

Indonesian politician (born 1920)

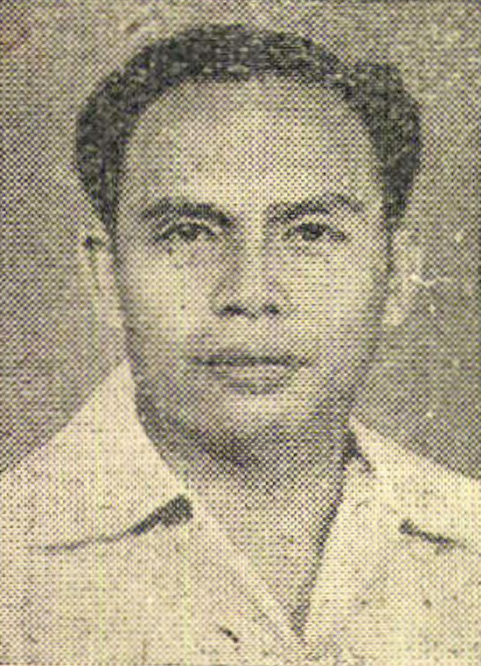

Member of People's Representative Council
- In office 1956–1959
- Constituency: East Java
- In office 1960–1965
- Constituency: None

Personal details
- Born: 20 September 1920 Payeti, Dutch East Indies
- Party: Communist Party of Indonesia
- Other political affiliations: Peasants Front of Indonesia
- Education: Leiden University
- Occupation: Politician

Jacob Piry (born 3 September 1920) was a Communist Party of Indonesia (PKI) politician. As a result of the 1955 general election, Jacob became a member of the Indonesian House of Representatives (DPR), representing the party until his membership was suspended on 15 November 1965 and only officially dismissed on 1 April 1966. While in parliament, Jacob served as Chairman of Commission B (Finance) from 1961 to 1964. He then became chairman of Commission F until 1965.

== Early life and study period ==
Jacob was born in Payeti, a village near Waingapu, on 20 September 1920. His father was a Sabu who worked as a colonial officer in Waingapu, while his younger brother, Samuel Nicodemus Piry, was a former deputy chairman of the PKI Provincial Committee of the East Nusa Tenggara and member of the MPRS. He studied in the Sekolah Rakjat (People's School) in Tenggoo, West Sumba for three years. Upon graduating from People's School, he continued his education in HIS in several places in Lesser Sunda Islands and Java.

In 1936, he took the entrance exam for the Koningin Emmaschool (abbreviated as KES) in Surabaya and passed. However, Jacob then transferred from KES to the Christian MULO (Christelijke MULO), where he underwent his secondary education until graduating in 1939. Subsequently, he enrolled in AMS Section A in Yogyakarta (now SMA Negeri 1 Yogyakarta) and studied there until 1942.

Jacob was in Java during the proclamation of independence, where he first became acquainted with the PKI. In 1946, he participated in the civil service selection exam and passed. To support his career as a civil servant, he studied literature (taalkundig) at the Faculty of Indologie of Leiden University for his undergraduate studies, then switched to economics for his doctoral education. He successfully completed his studies in 1952.

While studying in the Netherlands, Jacob was active as a member of the Indonesian Association (PI) and Indonesian Students Association (Rupi). It was during this time that he became a communist. Jacob had a bitter experience at university, where he was suspended by the university for not paying tuition fees.

== Early career ==
After graduating from Leiden, Jacob worked as a vizier who was seconded to the Governor's Office of Nusa Tenggara Province and was appointed Head of Legislation. He also became the head of the primary cooperative for employees of the governor's office and was involved in the Ministry of Home Affairs Workers' Union (SSKDN) in Singaraja as a member and leader. Apart from labor unions, Jacob was also active in Peasants Front of Indonesia (BTI) and became a member of the Regional Leadership Council (DPD) of Peasants Front of Indonesia Buleleng Regency branch.

== Career as a member of People's Representative Council ==
In the 1955 general election, Jacob became a candidate for the DPR and the Constitutional Assembly from the PKI. As a DPR candidate, his constituencies were East Java and West Nusa Tenggara. As a candidate for the Constituent Assembly, his constituency included West Java, East Java, West Nusa Tenggara, and East Nusa Tenggara. Jacob was successfully elected as a member of the DPR in the constituency of East Java, but failed to be elected as a member of the Constituent Assembly. He was sworn in as a member of the DPR on 24 March 1956.

On 27 December 1956, after a cabinet meeting due to Dahlan Ibrahim's resignation as a Minister of State for the Affairs of Former Indonesian Freedom Fighters, the cabinet decided to establish a commission tasked with discussing the division of Indonesian territory and to be completed within a month. The commission was chaired by S.M. Amin with Jacob as one of its members. Jacob was also one of the members of parliament who approved the formation of the Working Cabinet in the midst of the implementation of the state of emergency (staat van oorlog en beleg, abbreviated SOB) throughout Indonesia, representing his party's stance that approved the implementation of the SOB to oppose PRRI and Permesta which, apart from being seen as undermining national unity, were also a threat to the party as both movements were anti-communist. At the session hold on 5 June, in addition to reiterating his party's statement on regional movements, Jacob also criticized the credit policies of Finance Minister Jusuf Wibisono.

Jacob became the party's representative, along with Sudjito and Thobias Paulinus Rissi, to meet Deputy Prime Minister Mr. Hardi and Inspector General of Territorial and Popular Resistance Colonel Sadikin. They asked the two officials for information about the arrests of PKI members in Flores and Timor. Both men stated that they had not received any news about this, but both promised to ask for information and conduct an investigation. (Note: The article mentions the name "E. Rissi". However, it is most likely Thobias Paulinus Rissi, as there is no PKI figure named "E. Rissi".) Furthermore, Jacob also criticized the transparency of the flow of funds, the government's attitude, and other matters related to the State Budget (ABN, now APBN) draft from 1953 to 1956. In 1961, he was appointed chairman of Commission B (Finance) and served until 1964. He last served as chairman of Commission F (Finance and Financing) before his membership was suspended.

== Post-30 September Movement ==
Following the failure of the 30 September Movement, the government carried out a purge of communist groups throughout Indonesia, especially within the government. Jacob was among those affected. Since 15 November 1965, his parliament membership was suspended. He was then detained at the Salemba Detention Center (RTC). Due to the difficulty of obtaining proper food, he was forced to eat gecko meat to satisfy his hunger. Perhaps after his release from detention, he translated Jan van Baal's book Geschiedenis en Groei van de Theorie der Culturele Anthropologie: tot ± 1970. In Indonesian, the book is titled Pertumbuhan Teori Antropologi Budaya: Hingga Dekade 1970 (History and Growth of Cultural Anthropology Theory: Up to the Decade of 1970) and was first published in 1987.

== Bibliography ==
- Van Baal, Jan (1987). Sejarah dan Pertumbuhan Teori Antropolig Budaya (Hingga Dekade 1970). Jakarta: PT Gramedia.
- Departemen Penerangan (1961). Almanak Lembaga-Lembaga Negara dan Kepartaian. Jakarta: Departemen Penerangan Republik Indonesia.
- Departemen Penerangan (1955). Tjalon-Tjalon Dewan Perwakilan Rakjat untuk Pemilihan Umum I 1955. Jakarta: Kementerian Penerangan.
- Departemen Penerangan (1956). Kumpulan Peraturan-Peraturan untuk Pemilihan Konstituante. Kementerian Penerangan.
- Jajasan Pembaruan (1964). Ekonomi dan Masjarakat. Jajasan Pembaruan.
- Lev, Daniel S. (2009). The Transition to Guided Democracy: Indonesian Politics 1957–1959. Singapura: Equinox Publishing (Asia) Pte Ltd. ISBN 978-602-8397-40-7.
- Partai Komunis Indonesia (1956). PKI dan Perwakilan. Vol. 1. Jakarta: Partai Komunis Indonesia.
- Parlaungan (1956). Hasil Rakjat Memilih Tokoh-tokoh Parlemen (Hasil Pemilihan Umum Pertama – 1955) di Republik Indonesia (PDF). Jakarta: C.V. Gita. Archived (PDF) from the original on 2022-07-28.
- Sekretariat DPR-GR (1970). Seperempat Abad Dewan Perwakilan Rakjat Republik Indonesia.
- Toer, Pramoedya Ananta (1995). Nyanyi Sunyi Seorang Bisu: Catatan-Catatan dari Pulau Buru. Vol. 1. Kuala Lumpur: Wira Karya. ISBN 978-983-99604-3-3.
- Van Klinken, Gerry (2014). The Making of Middle Indonesia: Middle Classes in Kupang Town, 1930s–1980s (PDF). Leiden: Brill. Archived (PDF) from the original on 2024-07-04.
