= Women's union =

Women's union may refer to:

- Bulgarian Women's Union
- Crittenton Women's Union, Boston
- Murba Women's Union, Indonesia
- Lithuanian Women's Union
- Socialist Women's Union of Korea
- Sudanese Women's Union
- Ukrainian Women's Union
- Union of Women of Wallonia, Belgian women's association, 1912–1955
- Vietnam Women's Union
- Women's Union (Liechtenstein), women's section of the Patriotic Union
- Women's Union to Defend Paris and Care for the Wounded, 1871 organization during the Paris Commune
- Yemeni Women's Union
- Union of Sammarinese Women
