= Teuku Mohamad Thaher Thajeb =

Indonesian engineer and politician

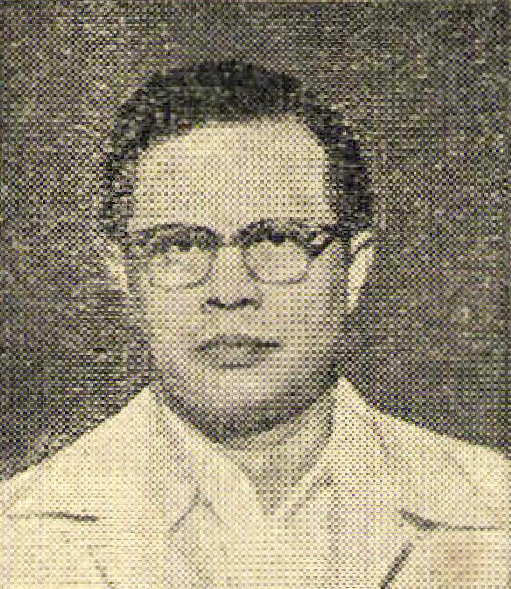
- Thajeb in 1956

Member of People's Representative Council
- In office 26 March 1956 – 22 July 1959
- Constituency: North Sumatra
- In office 25 June 1960 – 15 November 1965
- Constituency: None

Personal details
- Born: 24 April 1910 Bandung, Dutch East Indies
- Died: Unknown
- Party: PKI
- Spouse: Dina van Renssen
- Education: Delft University of Technology
- Occupation: Engineer; Politician

Teuku Mohamad Thaher Thajeb (24 April 1910 - unknown), also often written as Taher Thajeb, was an engineer and PKI politician who served as a member of the People's Representative Council from 1956 to 1965.

== Early life and education ==
Thajeb was born in Bandung on 24 April 1910. He was of Acehnese noble descent. His father was Teuku Cik Haji Mohamad Thajeb, and his mother was Siti Djuaenah. He received his primary education at Sekolah Rakyat (People's School). He then continued his junior high school at MULO and senior high school at AMS. After completing his studies, he attended Delft University of Technology, majoring in mechanical engineering, and earned his engineering degree in 1941.

== Career ==
=== Engineer career ===
After returning to Indonesia in 1945, Thajeb worked at the Djawatan Kereta Api workshop in Manggarai, Jakarta. In 1946, he moved to Cisurupan and continued working at the Railway Service. A year later, he moved to Gombong and then to Yogyakarta. In Yogyakarta, he served as the Head of Armament at the Ministry of Defense from 1947 to 1948.

In 1948, Thajeb was appointed Head of the Civil Aviation Division at the Ministry of Transportation and held that position until 1950. During his tenure, he was detained by the Dutch following the fall of Yogyakarta on 19 December 1948. Afterward, he served as Chairman of the Transportation Council (P3KI) at the Ministry of Transportation from 1951 to 1952. In 1953, Thajeb became a senior official assigned to assist the Minister of Transportation. He also held the position of advisor to the central board of the Ministry of Transportation Workers' Union. In March 1956, Iskandar Tedjasukmana appointed Thajeb as a member of the Central Labor Placement Advisory Council.

While working at the Ministry of Transportation, Thajeb also served as an Indonesian delegate at international conferences. In 1950, he served as the head of the Indonesian delegation at the ICAO Assembly in Montreal. Additionally, he was a member of the Indonesian delegation at the Land Transportation Conference organized by ECAFE in Bangkok in 1951 and the deputy head of the delegation for the World Economic Conference in Moscow in 1952.

=== Organizational and political career ===
Thajeb began his organizational career by joining the Medan branch of Pemuda Indonesia (Indonesian Youth), serving as deputy chairman from 1928 to 1930. Subsequently, he became a member of the Perhimpunan Indonesia (Indonesian Association) from 1933 to 1945. In 1956, he officially joined the Indonesian Communist Party (PKI). Additionally, he served as a member of the editorial board for the magazine Ilmu Marxis.

In 1955, Thajeb ran as a candidate for the Indonesian Parliament (DPR) from the Indonesian Communist Party (PKI) for the North Sumatra electoral district and was elected. On 2 August 1959, he participated in a protest against the banning of the Harian Rakjat newspaper. In 1960, Thajeb was appointed a member of the DPR Gotong Royong (Mutual Assistance House of Representatives) and joined Commission F (Development), where he served as the deputy chairman of the commission. He held this position until he was dismissed on 12 November 1965 due to the 30 September Movement.

While serving as a member of Parliament, he proposed extending the duration of higher education to five years and drafted a bill requiring companies with more than 1,000 employees to build housing for their workers. Additionally, he proposed the dissolution of the Ministry of Public Works to increase efficiency in development, suggesting that the ministry's responsibilities be transferred to local governments. After being dismissed as a member of Parliament, Thajeb was imprisoned in Salemba Prison and later transferred to a military prison on Budi Utomo Street.

== Personal life ==
Thajeb was the brother of Syarief Thayeb. On 3 July 1946, he married a Dutch woman named Dina van Renssen. She was the daughter of Andries van Renssen and Neetlje Wilhelmina van Leeuwen and was born in Delft on 24 October 1916.

== Bibliography ==
- Parlaungan (1956). Hasil Rakjat Memilih Tokoh-tokoh Parlemen (Hasil Pemilihan Umum Pertama - 1955) di Republik Indonesia (PDF). Jakarta: C.V. Gita. Archived (PDF) from the original on 28 July 2022.
