= Great Indonesia Unity Party =

Former political party in Indonesia

Great Indonesian Unity Party–Hazairin/ Great Indonesian Unity Party–Wongsonegoro PIR–Hazairin/ PIR–Wongsonegoro
- Leader: Wongsonegoro (Wongsonegoro's faction) Hazairin (Hazairin's faction)
- Founded: 1948; as PNI–Merdeka (PNI-Independent)
- Split from: Indonesian National Party (Right faction)
- Headquarters: Jakarta, Indonesia
- Ideology: Conservatism; Indonesian nationalism
- Political position: Centre-right
- DPR (1955): 2 / 257
- Konstituante: 4 / 514

The Great Indonesia Unity Party (Indonesian: Partai Parsatuan Indonesia Raya, PIR) was an Indonesian political party established in 1948. It was founded by a group of dissenters who broke away from the Indonesian National Party (PNI) because of their dissatisfaction with the PNI's increasingly left-wing stance. Its chairman was Wongsonegoro, governor of Central Java. The party aimed to be based on neither religion like the Masyumi or a western political outlook (like the PNI). Initially known as the PNI-Merdeka (PNI-Independent) it subsequently changed its name to the Great Indonesia Unity Party.

In 1954, following an internal dispute about whether the party should continue to serve in the cabinet, it split into two factions. In the 1955 Indonesian legislative election, the faction led by Wongsonegoro won 0.5 percent of the vote, while the faction led by Hazairin won 0.3 percent. Each faction was awarded one seat in the legislature, the People's Consultative Assembly.

== Election results ==
=== People's Representative Council ===
Election	Party leader	Seats	Seat change	Votes	% of votes	Outcome of election
1955	Wongsonegoro (Wongsonegoro's faction)	1 / 257		178,481	0.47%	Opposition
1955	Hazairin (Hazairin's faction)	1 / 257		114,644	0.30%	Governing coalition

=== Constitutional Assembly ===
Election	Party leader	Seats	Votes	% of votes	Bloc
1955	Wongsonegoro (Wongsonegoro's faction)	2 / 514	162,420	0.43%	Pancasila Bloc
1955	Hazairin (Hazairin's faction)	2 / 514	101,509	0.27%	Pancasila Bloc
