= People's Youth (Indonesia) =

Youth wing of the communist party of Indonesia

People's Youth (Indonesian: Pemuda Rakyat) was the youth wing of the Communist Party of Indonesia (PKI). The organisation was formed as the Socialist Youth of Indonesia (Pemuda Sosialis Indonesia or Pesindo). Initially the organisation was set up on the initiative of then Minister of Defence Amir Sjarifuddin, as the youth wing of the Socialist Party of Indonesia. A congress was held on 10 and 11 November 1945, where seven locally based youth outfits merged. Rapidly it gained a membership of around 25,000. The organisation took part in the armed struggle for independence during the Indonesian National Revolution. Pesindo units were engaged in intense street fighting during the Battle of Surabaya.

Pesindo took part, along with PKI and FDR, in the Madiun Uprising in 1948.

In 1950 the organisation established its ties to the Indonesian Communist Party (PKI) and changed its name to "Pemuda Rakyat". At the congress of November 1950 Francisca C. Fanggidaej became the chairwoman of the organisation. Sukatno became the general secretary.

According to the American CIA, the People's Youth claimed membership of 1,250,000 in 1962, with that strength being principally in Java.

In 1964, according to the PKI, the People's Youth had two million members.

Membership of Pemuda Rakyat reached around three million in 1965. Pemuda Rakyat was effectively eliminated along with PKI during the Indonesian killings of 1965–66.
