= Sukatno Hoeseni =

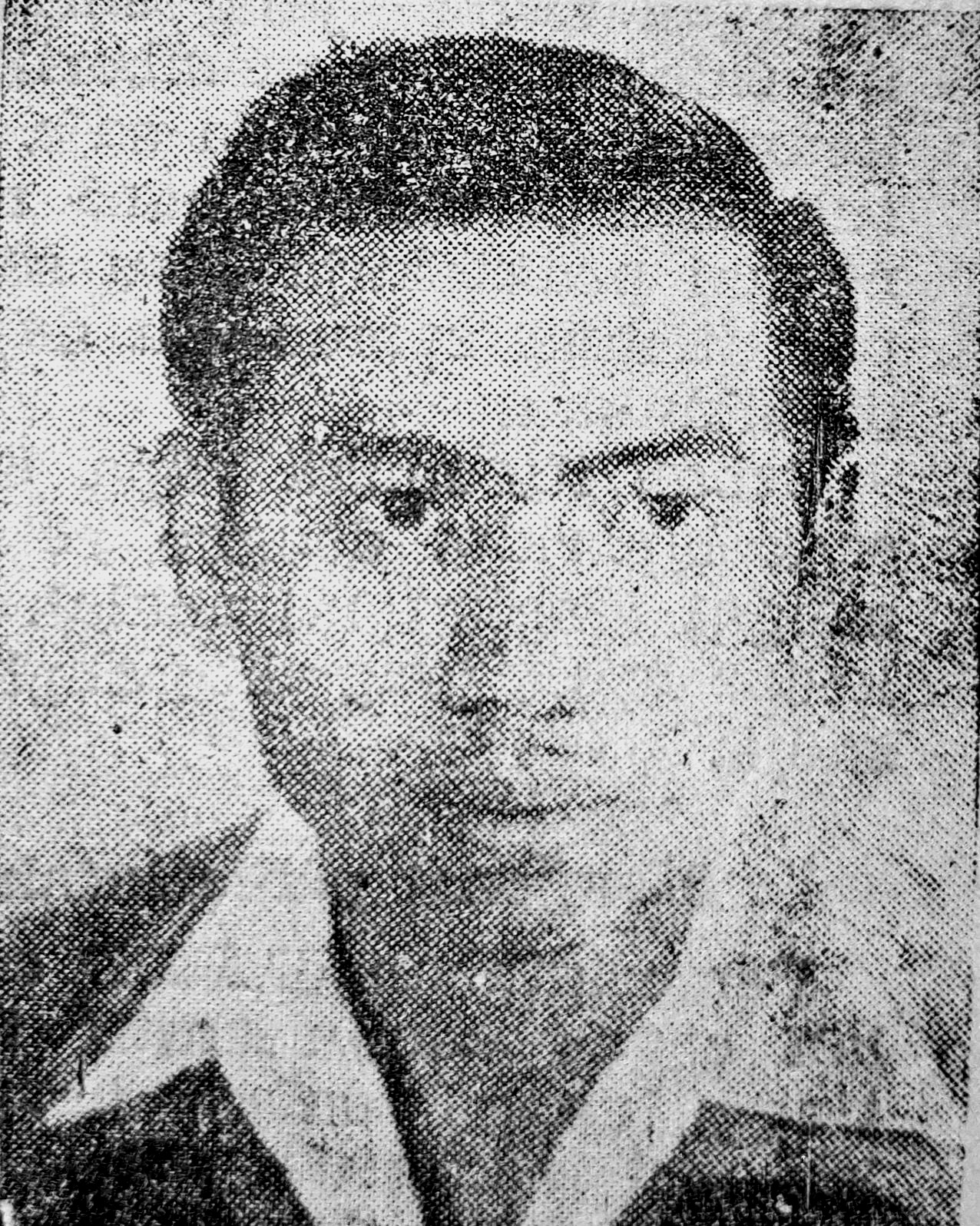

Member of People's Representative Council
- In office 24 March 1956 – 22 July 1959
- Constituency: East Java
- In office 25 June 1960 – 15 November 1965

Personal details
- Born: 31 December 1929 Malang, Dutch East Indies
- Died: 17 April 1997 (aged 67) Jakarta, Indonesia
- Party: PKI
- Spouse: Lies Katno
- Occupation: Politician

Sukatno Hoesni; Perfected Spelling: Sukatno Husni (31 December 1929 – 17 April 1997) was an Indonesian politician. He was a member of the Indonesian Communist Party (PKI) from East Java who served as a member of the House of Representatives (DPR) from 1956 until 1965. He became the youngest member of the DPR when he was inaugurated in 1956.

== Biography ==
=== Education and early career ===
Sukatno was born in Malang on 31 December 1929. His father, Wir Margo, worked as a blacksmith at the Lestari sugar factory in Kertosono, while his mother was a Gerwani activist in Patianrowo.

Sukatno received his primary education at a Sekolah Rakyat (People's School) during the Japanese occupation, and that was his highest level of formal education. While in school, he also worked as a tennis ball boy to pay for his tuition. After graduating from elementary school, he worked as an electrician at the Lestari sugar factory. Later, he worked at a chemical plant located not far from Surabaya.

=== Military and political career ===
Sukatno began his military career in Surabaya after the outbreak of the Indonesian Revolution by joining the Pesindo militia. In 1946, he moved to South Sumatra to strengthen Pesindo in its efforts against the Dutch. He remained in South Sumatra until 1949.

After the Dutch-Indonesian Round Table Conference, Sukatno joined the People's Youth (PR) and was elected as the second secretary of the organization's Central Executive Board (DPP) at the end of 1950. A year later, he joined the Indonesian Communist Party (PKI). By the end of 1952, he was elected as the first secretary of the PR's Central Executive Board. He also joined the World Federation of Democratic Youth (WFDY) and became a member of its executive committee in 1953. As a member of WFDY, he conducted working visits to various countries, such as India, Myanmar, and Japan, to enhance cooperation in strengthening world peace.

Sukatno ran as a candidate for the House of Representatives (DPR) from the Indonesian Communist Party (PKI) in the East Java electoral district during the 1955 Indonesian legislative election. He successfully secured a seat in the DPR and was inaugurated as a member on 24 March 1956. At the age of 26, Sukatno became the youngest member of House of Representatives at the time. He then joined the PKI faction in the DPR.

After Sukarno issued the decree in 1959 dissolving the 1955-elected DPR, Sukatno remained a member of the Mutual Assistance House of Representatives until 1965. In 1962, he ordered the mobilization of a quarter million People Youth members to undergo military training in support of Operation Trikora. He also involved in the 30 September Movement.

While serving as a member of the DPR, he criticized the draft Emergency Law since it still contained colonial elements, as well as the defense budget, which was focused solely on maintenance rather than on building the armed forces and acquiring new weaponry and equipment.

=== Post 30 September Movement Incident ===
After the 30 September Movement, Sukatno chose to move to southern Blitar and joined the remaining members of the PKI. This group of PKI remnants launched guerrilla attacks against the Indonesian National Armed Forces (TNI). While operating as a guerrilla in southern Blitar, he found that the local population did not fully support the PKI.

Sukatno was subsequently arrested on 21 July 1968, and imprisoned at Lowokwaru Prison in Malang. At the end of August 1968, he was transferred to Cipinang Prison. While incarcerated in Cipinang, Sukatno was known as someone who enjoyed engaging in discussions.

Sukatno then went through a trial process, revealing that he had received between Rp 15 to Rp 20 million from Sudisman to fund military training in Lubang Buaya. He was subsequently sentenced to death on 11 March 1971. This news prompted protests from the Dutch Youth Organization, which staged demonstrations during the visit of the Indonesian Minister of Manpower to the Netherlands in 1971. He appealed to the Supreme Court, but his appeal was rejected. Additionally, he also requested clemency from Suharto, but his request was denied.

Sukatno's health deteriorated in 1996 due to a stroke and complications from other illnesses. As a result, he could no longer speak and was confined to bed. On 17 April 1997, he was rushed to the Police Hospital after his condition became critical. On the same day, he died.

== Personal life ==
Sukatno married a journalist named Lies Katno.

== Bibliography ==
- Parlaungan (1956). Hasil Rakjat Memilih Tokoh-tokoh Parlemen (Hasil Pemilihan Umum Pertama - 1955) di Republik Indonesia (PDF). Jakarta: C.V. Gita. Archived (PDF) from the original on 2022-07-28.
