= Tjoo Tik Tjoen =

Chinese-Indonesian politician (born 1921)

- 曹德崇
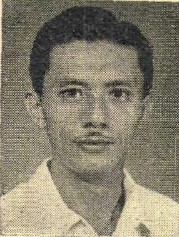
- Tjoo Tik Tjoen in 1956

Member of House of Representatives
- In office 26 March 1956 – 22 July 1959
- Constituency: East Java
- In office 22 July 1959 – 20 May 1964
- Succeeded by: Abdulla Baraba

Personal details
- Born: 15 April 1921 Surabaya, Dutch East Indies
- Party: PKI
- Children: 9
- Education: Tongji University
- Profession: Politician

Tjoo Tik Tjoen (Chinese: 曹德崇; Pe̍h-ōe-jī: Chô Tek-chông; pinyin: Cáo Déchóng; born 15 April 1921) was a Chinese Indonesian left-wing politician and teacher. He served as a Member of the House of Representatives from 1956 to 1964 from the Communist Party of Indonesia (PKI).

== Early life and education ==
Tjoen was born in Surabaya on 15 April 1921. He studied for a year at Tongji University.

== Career ==
=== Education and business career ===
From February 1941 to August 1941, Tjoen served as the Principal of THHK People’s School in Lawang. He then became a teacher at Sin Hwa Middle School in Surabaya from January to December 1946.

Tjoen moved to Ampenan in January 1947 and worked as a teacher at the THHK secondary school there until June. After that, he returned to Surabaya and worked as the deputy director of NV Pyramid from June 1948 to March 1956.

=== Political career ===
Tjoen began his political career in 1945 by serving as the chairman of the Chinese association Ta Chung She, a position he held until 1946. During the National Revolution, he was actively opposed to Pao An Tui and the Pangkal Pinang Conference. In October 1948, the Dutch arrested Tjoen and imprisoned him in the Lowokwaru Detention Camp in Malang. He was released from prison in January 1950.

After being released from prison, Tjoen joined an organization named Surabaya National Development Force and served as its treasurer in February 1950. He was later arrested in August 1951 due to his leftist views and was only released in February 1952. Tjoen joined Baperki in an unknown year and was appointed secretary of the Surabaya branch of Baperki in April 1954.

In the 1955 election, Tjoen ran for a seat in the House of Representatives (DPR) as a PKI candidate, even though he was not yet an official member of the party. He was elected as a DPR member from East Java in the 1955 election. After being elected, he officially joined the PKI in March 1956. When the DPR formed from the 1955 election was dissolved, Tjoen became a member of the Mutual Assistance House of Representatives. He joined Commission D, responsible for production, and served as its deputy chairman. Tjoen resigned as a DPR member on 20 May 1964, following a PKI decree dated 17 July 1963, and was replaced by Abdulla Baraba.

As a member of parliament, Tjoen, along with Siauw Giok Tjhan, Sutomo, Imam Soetardjo, Hartojo Prawirosudarmo, and Soeprapto, submitted an interpellation regarding the appointment of minority group representatives in parliament in October 1956. He did so because he found that those representing minority groups were appointed by the government and instead backed by Masjumi, NU, and Parkindo. He also showed the letters from the Chinese Muslim and Indo communities showing that they did not endorse the minority group representatives. In the 1956 budget draft discussions, he criticized the draft budget for being too consumptive and suggested nationalizing foreign companies to increase revenue. He also urged the government to review the premium system because it created opportunities for corruption and reduced state income. In addition, he opposed Assaat’s proposal, which urged the government to adopt economic policies favoring indigenous entrepreneurs. He argued that such a policy was unreasonable and full of racial discrimination.

After resigning from parliament, Tjoen remained active in the PKI. He became the head of the PKI delegation during a visit to China in October 1964 to attend the 15th anniversary celebration of the founding of the People’s Republic of China.

== Post 30 September Movement ==
After the 30 September Movement, Tjoen was arrested on 24 December 1965 and detained in a military barracks in Jakarta. He was later put into prison outside Jakarta. In 1971, he was transferred to Buru.

== Personal life ==
Tjoen was married and had nine children.

== Bibliography ==
- Parlaungan (1956). Hasil Rakjat Memilih Tokoh-tokoh Parlemen (Hasil Pemilihan Umum Pertama - 1955) di Republik Indonesia (PDF). Jakarta: C.V. Gita. Archived (PDF) from the original on 28 July 2022.
