= Murba Women's Union =

The Murba Women's Union (Indonesian: Persatuan Wanita Murba, 'Murba' approximately meaning 'proletarian'), abbreviated Perwamu, was an Indonesian women's organization. Perwamu was founded on September 17, 1950. It was politically linked to the leftwing nationalist Murba Party (which had been founded by Tan Malaka in 1948). The organization undertook social, economic and educational activities. The organizational structure of Perwamu was based on democratic centralism. Perwamu disappeared after the 1965 coup d'état.

== Social activities ==
Perwamu ran various social assistance programmes to help poor women and children. The organization supported the set-up of 'household industries' (such as batik and weaving), thus creating livelihoods for women. It also gave counseling on how to obtain government credits, as well as facilitating the set-up of joint purchasing and savings plans for women.

Perwamu was active in educational activities, both studies in ideological doctrine as well as providing more general education. The organization set up various study centres (schools and reading rooms) to be able to spread education amongst the women of Indonesia. Specifically, the organization ran programmes to prevent prostitution, and provided educational assistance to former prostitutes.

== Political campaigns ==
In the late 1950s, Perwamu took part in the mass campaigns to make the Indonesian state officially celebrate International Women's Day (March 8). Along with other women's organizations, Perwamu also took part in campaigns to call for Indonesian sovereignty over West Irian.
