= Ibnu Parna =

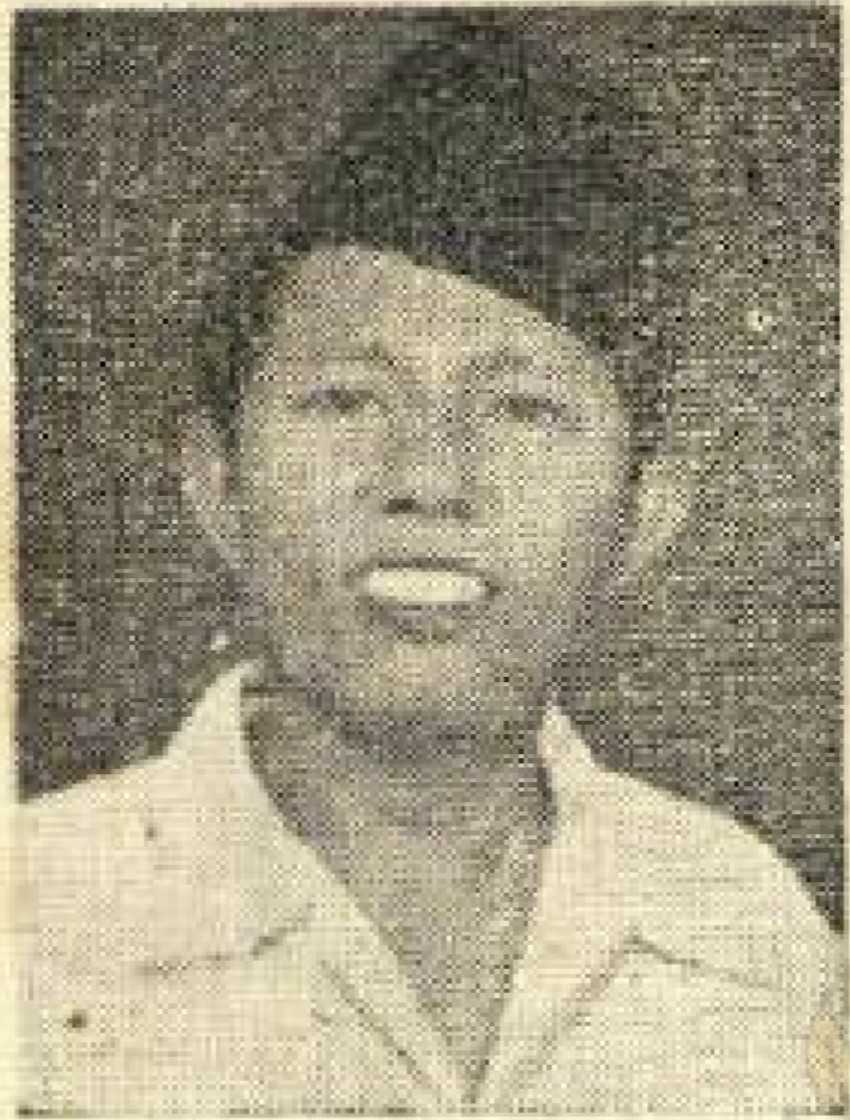
Ibnu Parna in 1955

Ibnu Parna (died 1965) was an Indonesian communist politician and leader of the Acoma Party (Partai Acoma), and trade unionist.

Involved in the anti-colonial struggle in Indonesia as a youth leader in Semarang, Parna was elected an Indonesian Parliament member for the Acoma Party in 1955. Subsequently harassed by Indonesia's authoritarian government, Parna was arrested and killed by Indonesia's authorities, together with hundreds of thousands of other leftists, in the killings of 1965-66.

== Biography ==
Ibnu Parna took active part in the anti-colonial struggle as a youth leader in Semarang. In November 1945 he became vice chairman of Pesindo (Indonesian Socialist Youth) representing Angkatan Muda Republik Indonesia ('Young Force of the Republic of Indonesia'), the main youth movement from Semarang. His elder brother, Krissubanu, had also been a youth leader.

In early 1946 Ibnu Parna was included, representing Pesindo, in the subcommittee of Persatuan Perdjuangan. However, on March 6, 1946, the Pesindo leadership decided to withdraw Ibnu Parna's position as the Pesindo representative in the PP subcommittee.

Parna emerged as the leader of the Young Communist Force (Angkatan Comunis Muda), a youth movement associated with the Revolutionary People's Movement of Tan Malaka. Acoma, founded in June 1946, later evolved into the Acoma Party.

In the 1955 parliamentary election, Ibnu Parna was elected as a Member of Parliament. He was the sole Acoma Party candidate to win a seat. Around this period, Ibnu Parna served as organizing secretary of the trade union centre SOBRI.

In 1956 Ibnu Parna took part in the world congress of the Trotskyist International Secretariat of the Fourth International.

In February 1959 Ibnu Parna was arrested for having published a pamphlet which denounced the rule of General Nasution, his parliamentary immunity notwithstanding.

The Acoma Party was banned in 1965. Ibnu Parna was arrested and killed in the mass killings of 1965.
