= Teuku =

Teuku is an Indonesian masculine name of Acehnese descent that may refer to:

- Teuku Jacob (1929–2007), Indonesian paleoanthropologist
- Teuku Mohammad Hamzah Thayeb (born 1952), Indonesian diplomat
- Teungku Nyak Arif (1899–1946), Acehnese nationalist and National Hero of Indonesia
- Teuku Rifnu Wikana (born 1980), Indonesian actor
- Teuku Umar (1854–1899), leader of a guerrilla campaign against the Dutch in Aceh, Indonesia
- Teuku Wisnu (born 1985), Indonesian soap opera actor
- Teuku Zakaria (1929–1973), Malaysian artist of Acehnese descent.
