= Sobri, Valandovo =

Sobri Собри
- Village
- Location within North Macedonia
- Coordinates: 41.293207°N 22.634517°E
- Country: North Macedonia
- Region: Southeastern
- Municipality: Valandovo

Population (2021)
  - Total: 180
- Time zone: UTC+1 (CET)
  - Summer (DST): UTC+2 (CEST)
- Website: .

Sobri (Macedonian: Собри) is a village in the municipality of Valandovo, North Macedonia.

== Demographics ==
According to the 2002 census, the village had a total of 225 inhabitants. Ethnic groups in the village include:

- Macedonians 217
- Serbs 8

As of 2021, the village of Sobrin has 180 inhabitants and the ethnic composition was the following:

- Macedonians – 172
- Serbs – 1
- others – 1
- Person without Data - 6
