= Sentral Organisasi Buruh Republik Indonesia =

SOBRI
- Merged into: FSBI
- Founded: 1951
- Dissolved: 1973
- Headquarters: Merdeka Utara, Jakarta
- Location: Indonesia
- Members: 116,928 (1957)
- Key people: Sjaman Harju Udaya, Budyarto Martoadmodjo, Slamet Djojosumitro, Ibnu Parna, E. Curdian
- Affiliations: WFTU

Sentral Organisasi Buruh Republik Indonesia ('Central Labour Organization of the Republic of Indonesia', abbreviated SOBRI) was an Indonesian trade union centre. SOBRI was founded in Bandung in 1951. SOBRI functioned as the trade union wing of the Murba Party.

== Leadership ==
By 1955, Sjaman Harju Udaya was the chairman of SOBRI, Budyarto Martoadmodjo the general secretary, Slamet Djojosumitro the executive secretary and Ibnu Parna the organising secretary. By 1958, Slamet Djojosumitro served as general secretary, Ibnu Parna as first secretary, E. Curdian as second secretary and Mansur Bogok as international secretary.

== International affiliation ==
In October 1953, following the death of Joseph Stalin, SOBRI joined the World Federation of Trade Unions. Moreover, in late 1953 SOBRI announced that it would cooperate with the Communist Party of Indonesia-dominated SOBSI.

== Membership ==
The strength of SOBRI was mainly concentrated to Java. In 1955, the total membership of SOBRI was estimated at 30,000. As of June 1956, SOBRI had 39,936 registered members (However, SOBRI itself claimed to have 125,325 members at this juncture). By June 1957, SOBRI had 43,862 registered members. By late 1957, Regional Labour Offices reported a total membership of 116,928. By March 1958 SOBRI claimed a membership of 281,000.

== Affiliated unions ==
As of August 1955, SOBRI counted with 14 affiliated trade unions. By the end of 1957, the number had dipped to eight. By late 1958 SOBRI had nine affiliated unions. The SOBRI-affiliated trade union in the plantation estate sector was Sarbupri-SOBRI, one of several smaller unions that had begun to challenge the hegemony of the SOBSI-affiliated Sarbupri amongst the estate workers.

== Merger into FSBI ==
SOBRI merged into Federasi Seluruh Buruh Indonesia in 1973, as did all other trade union centres in the country.
