= Murba Party =

Former political party in Indonesia

Murba Party Partai Murba
- Chairman: Sukarni
- General Secretary: Sjamsu Harja Udaja
- Founder: Tan Malaka; Chaerul Saleh; Sukarni; Adam Malik
- Founded: 7 November 1948
- Dissolved: 11 January 1973
- Preceded by: People's Party; Poor People's Party; Independent Labour Party of Indonesia
- Merged into: Indonesian Democratic Party
- Succeeded by: Murba Party (1998)
- Newspaper: Murba; Massa
- Youth wing: PARRI
- Women's wing: Murba Women's Union
- Membership (1948): 80,000
- Ideology: National communism Murbaism; Faction: Tan Malaka Thought
- Political position: Left-wing to far-left
- Labour wing: SOBRI

Murba Party (Indonesian: Partai Murba, Partai Musyawarah Rakyat Banyak, Proletarian Party) was a 'national communist' political party in Indonesia. The party was founded by Tan Malaka, Chairul Saleh, Sukarni and Adam Malik in 1948. The history of the party was largely intertwined with that of the powerful Communist Party of Indonesia (PKI). Initially relations between PKI and the Murba Party were fluid, but gradually the two parties developed into each other's arch-enemies. The Murba Party continued to exist under the New Order, but was merged into the Indonesian Democratic Party in 1973.

== Founding ==
The 1948 Madiun Affair had resulted in a severe backlash for the PKI. Across Java (except in Bantam), a political vacuum emerged on the political left. The followers of Tan Malaka sought to capitalize on this, and on 3 October 1948 the three main constituents of the Tan Malaka-led Revolutionary People's Movement (GRR); the People's Party, Poor People's Party and the Independent Labour Party of Indonesia, declared that they would merge to form the unitary Murba Party. The merger was to be completed on 7 November 1948, the anniversary of the Russian Revolution. The constitution of the party was declared on 12 November 1948. At the time of its foundation the new party had around 80,000 members. The GRR continued to exist separately though, with the Murba Party as one of its affiliates.

Whilst Tan Malaka was highly influential in the party, he wasn't formally the leader of the party. At the time of the merger a leadership was formed consisting of Sukarni (president), Sjamsu Harja Udaja (general secretary), Maruto Nitimihardjo (vice president), Sutan Dewanis (second vice president) and Pandu Karta Wiguna (secretary). The Murba Party published two official newspapers, Murba and Massa. Furthermore, there were guerrilla units linked to the party, which played an important role in the struggle against Dutch rule in West and Central Java.

== Political profile ==
Although far smaller than the PKI, the Murba Party constituted an important rival to it. The leadership of the Murba Party was largely made up by leaders of mass movements. The young men who led Murba had often been leaders of guerrillas or mass struggles against the Japanese occupation. The party appealed to ex-guerrillas and workers, who were dissatisfied with post-independence developments. Herbert Feith labelled the profile of the party as 'extreme nationalism and messianic social radicalism (whose inchoateness was only mildly tempered by the Marxist and Leninist theory to which it laid claim), it was a citadel of "oppositionism", the politics of refusing to recognize the practical difficulties of governments'.

The Murba Party was secular, and wary of the possibility of increased Islamic influence in government.

== Early 1950s ==
In March 1951 the party joined the Consultative Body of Political Parties, a broad coalition initiated by PKI that soon became non-functional. During the following year, PKI-Murba relations improved significantly. At the time, Murba guerrilla units still roamed in West Java and held some territories under their control.

In February 1952, the party supported a parliamentary motion calling for the opening of diplomatic relations with the Soviet Union.

== 1955 elections ==
The Murba Party suffered a stark setback in the 1955 legislative election. The party obtained 199,588 votes (0.53% of the national vote), and won two seats from Java in the People's Representative Council (down from four seats prior to the elections). After the election, the Murba Party MPs joined the National Progressive Fraction, a body of ten MPs from Java. In the 1955 Constituent Assembly election, the party obtained 248,633 votes (0.66%) and four seats in the assembly.

== Guided Democracy ==
When President Sukarno introduced Guided Democracy in 1957, the Murba Party was the first to declare its outright support to the plan. The Murba Party became one of ten parties that were legal under the Guided Democracy. The Murba Party were highly supportive of President Sukarno during this period, and repeatedly sought to gain Sukarno's confidence and convince him to turn against the PKI. The Murba Party politician and Minister of Education Priyono, became the head of the Guided Democracy Committee.

During the 1958 Revolutionary Government of the Republic of Indonesia (PRRI) rebellion, Murba Party cadres were seized by PRRI rebels and held at the Muara Labuh detention camp in West Sumatra.

Adam Malik, one of the founding leaders of the Murba Party, was named as the Indonesian ambassador to the Soviet Union and Poland. In 1960 Chaerul Saleh of the Murba Party became chairman of the National Council. He also came to serve as chairman of the National Front.

== International shifts ==
During the November 1962 Cuban Missile Crisis, the Murba Party voiced its support for Cuba and declared that the party was willing to send volunteers to help the Cubans.

In 1959 the Murba Party had declared that China was the state in the Eastern Bloc with whom it felt closest affinity but with the PKI-Soviet in 1963, the Murba Party reoriented itself towards building relations with the Soviet Union instead. Once it was clear that PKI had sided with the Chinese Communist Party in the Sino-Soviet split, one sector of the Murba Party began to negotiate with the Communist Party of the Soviet Union regarding the possibility that the Murba-led mass organizations could replace PKI mass organizations in pro-Soviet international communist structures. The Murba Party, on its behalf, began calling for the inclusion of the Soviet Union into the Afro-Asian fraternity. These contacts were aided by the fact that the Murba leader Adam Malik had been stationed as ambassador in Moscow. In 1963 Adam Malik returned to Indonesia, and became Minister of Trade.

== Conflict with PKI culminates ==
In April 1964 the Murba Party proposed that a one-party system be introduced in Indonesia, seeking support from President Sukarno for the idea. The underlying purpose of the plan was to eliminate PKI as an independent political force. Parties like the Indonesian National Party and Nahdatul Ulama protested against the proposal, and in the end the Murba Party failed to convince Sukarno to endorse the proposal. However, the proposal did gain some quiet support from sectors of the army. Later the same year, when President Sukarno expressed his willingness to include PKI in the government, the Murba Party was one of the parties that voiced its opposition.

During this period, the Murba Party was publicly targeted by the PKI. In its anti-price hike mass campaigns the PKI singled out the Murba Party ministers Adam Malik and Chaerul Saleh as responsible. Issues that had aroused the fury of the PKI were the alliances of the Murba Party with anti-Communist sectors and anti-Sukarno army officers, the support of the Murba Party for U.S. film imports and the covert Soviet-Murba contacts.

== Crackdown on the Murba Party ==
On 6 January 1965 the government declared that the activities of the Murba Party had been 'frozen'. Murba Party leaders were arrested. The 'freezing' of the Murba Party followed the ban by Sukarno on the 'Body to Promote Sukarnoism' (BPS, in which prominent Murba Party figures had played leading roles). Through its activities in BPS (directed towards the breaking the political influence of PKI), the Murba Party had moved outside the political boundaries of the Nasakom concept of Sukarno's Guided Democracy. Sukarno believed that the BPS campaign had been manipulated by the U.S. Central Intelligence Agency.

Following the 'freezing' of the Murba Party, PKI continued ferocious attacks on the party. PKI declared that the Murba Party was a party of 'Trotskyites' and 'imperialist agents'. Demands were raised that the Murba Party ministers be expelled from the government, pro-Murba newspapers be closed and that Murba Party members be expelled from the journalists' union and other semi-official structures.

== Under the New Order regime ==
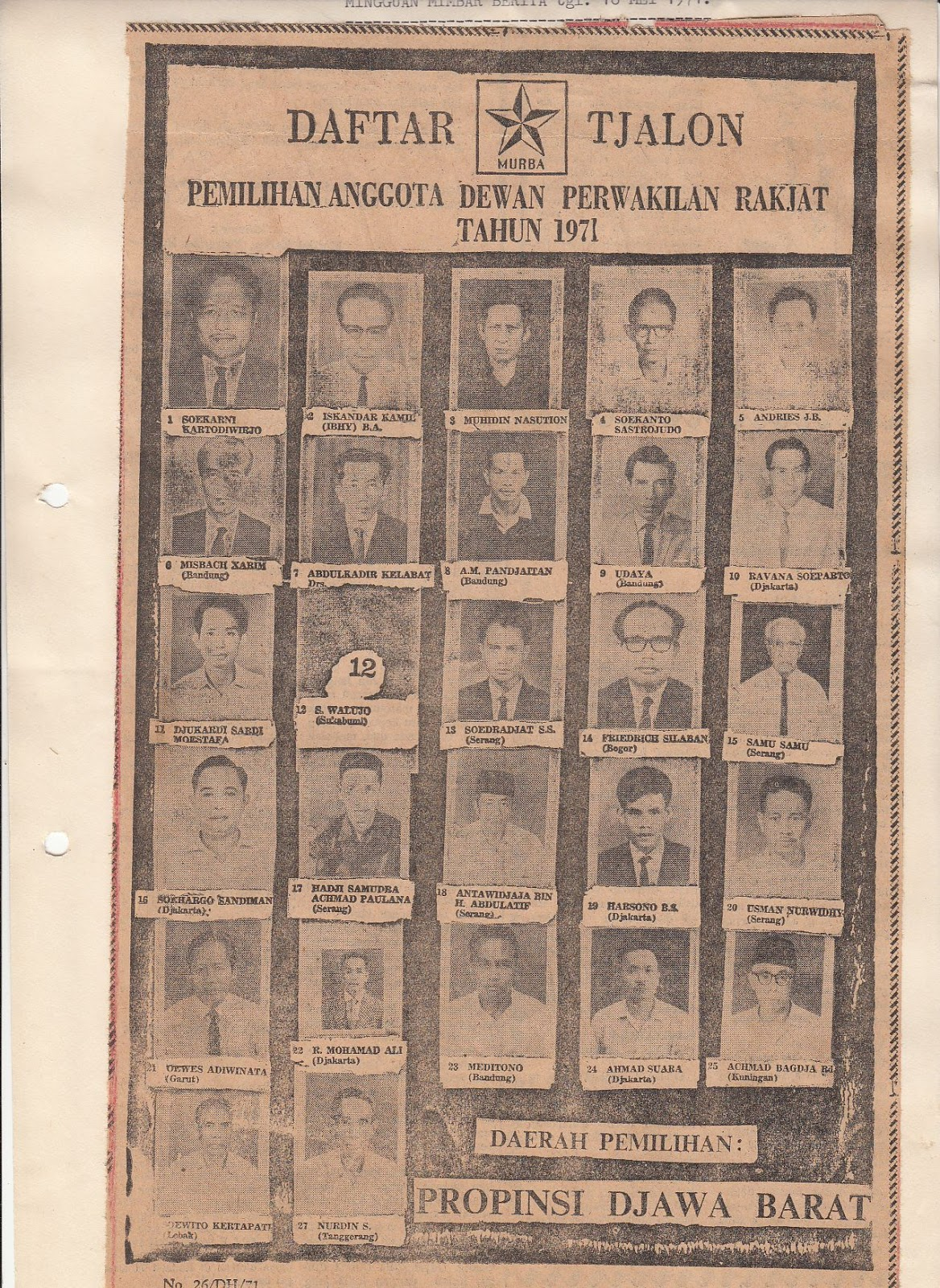
List of election candidates from the Murba Party in 1971. Ibrahim Yaacob is beside Sukarni.

After the 1965–1966 anticommunist genocide, the Murba Party continued its activities. It was able to retain small pockets of influence. In February 1966, Adam Malik became the Foreign Minister and a Deputy Prime Minister under Sukarno in the Dwikora II & Dwikora III cabinets until July 1966.

Under Suharto's rule, the surviving political parties of the 'Old Order' were pressured to consolidate themselves into two political blocs, one Islamic and one 'secular'. The Murba Party was included in the latter category and in March 1970 the Democratic Development Group (Kelompok Persatuan Pembangunan) was formed, consisting of the Murba Party, Indonesian National Party (PNI), the League of Supporters of Indonesian Independence (IPKI), the Catholic Party and the Indonesian Christian Party (Parkindo).

The Murba Party took part in the 1971 parliamentary election. The party got 48,126 votes nationwide (0.1%), and failed to win any seats.

On 10 January 1973 the Murba Party and the other members of the Democratic Development Group merged into the Indonesian Democratic Party.

After the New Order fell in 1998, a reincarnation of the party participated in the 1999 Indonesian legislative election, but only received 62,006 (0.06%) votes and once more failed to win any seats.

== Election results ==
=== People's Representative Council ===
Election	Party leader	Seats	Votes	% of votes
1955	Sukarni	2 / 257	199,588	0.53%

=== Constitutional Assembly ===
Election	Party leader	Seats	Votes	% of votes	Bloc
1955	Sukarni	4 / 514	248,633	0.66%	Socio-Economic Bloc
