= Fransisca Fanggidaej =

Indonesian-born Dutch activist, radio announcer, and teacher

- Born: Fransisca Casparina Fanggidaej; 16 August 1925; Kupang Regency, Dutch East Indies
- Died: 13 November 2013 (aged 88); Zeist, Netherlands
- Citizenship: Indonesia; Netherlands
- Occupations: Revolutioner; radio announcer; teacher; translator
- Spouse: Supriyo
- Children: 7
- Relatives: Reza Rahadian (grandson)

Fransisca Casparina Fanggidaej (16 August 1925 – 13 November 2013) was an Indonesian-born Dutch activist, radio announcer, teacher, and translator who was the member of Pemuda Sosialis Indonesia. She was the maternal grandmother of actor Reza Rahadian.

== Early life ==
Fransisca Casparina Fanggidaej was born on 16 August 1925 in Noelmina, a village in Takari, Kupang Regency, to Gottlieb Fanggidaej and Magda Maël. Her father worked as a head supervisor of the Department of Civil and Public Works of the Dutch East Indies government, and was referred as "Black Netherlands" by locals. She was raised within the Indo cultural influence, was educated alongside other Caucasian students, and spoken Dutch language in her daily life.

== Career ==
Fransisca felt disturbed when she had to see people lower their heads and squat (whilst walking) to pay respect to her parents. She also encountered some form of racism towards her family from the Dutch settlers due to her being classified as a "colored person", which then began to raise her spirit on anti-colonialism.

This prompted her to start an open discussion with the Moluccan youth in Surabaya, East Java, during the Japanese occupation of the Dutch East Indies which in itself helps the progress of the Indonesian independence. Later on, she joined Pemuda Republik Indonesia. In november 1945, she attended first Kongres Pemuda Indonesia in Yogyakarta, Special Region of Yogyakarta, and later joined as a combatant (troop) in the Battle of Surabaya.

Fransisca joined Pemuda Sosialis Indonesia and formed the women' faction in Mojokerto, East Java. After moving to Madiun, she became a radio announcer for Radio Gelora Pemoeda Indonesia under the supervision of Badan Kongres Pemuda Republik Indonesia. She broadcast using two languages, that being English and Dutch, alongside her colleague, Yetty Zein, and then they were labeled as a rebel and an extremist by the Dutch East Indies government.

In 1946, she was commissioned by Badan Kongres Pemuda Republik Indonesia to do a youth revolution safari in various countries. She traveled from India to Czechoslovakia with brochures, photographs, and posters, to inform the masses about Indonesia's struggle. In 1948, she attended the Calcutta Youth Conference and later attended the Bandung Conference in 1955.

== Personal life ==
Fransisca was married to Supriyo, a journalist, and has had seven children: Nilakandi Sri Luntowati, Dien Rieny Saraswati, Godam Ratamtama, Nusa Eka Indriya (born 1956), Savitri Sasanti Rini, Pratiwi Widantini Matulessy (born 1960), and Mayanti Trikarini (born 1962).

Her daughter, Pratiwi, was married to a Persian Muslim man, Rahim, and later gave birth to a son, Reza Rahadian, who went to became an actor.

== Works cited ==
- Setiawan, Andri (2020-07-13). "Francisca Fanggidaej, Perempuan Pejuang yang Terbuang - Historia". historia.id (in Indonesian).
- Affan, Heyder (2021-09-27). "'Saya selalu berdoa, kapan bertemu ibu', kisah Francisca Fanggidaej dan tujuh anaknya 'terpisah' sejak G30S". BBC News Indonesia (in Indonesian).
- Media, Kompas Cyber (2021-09-29). "Kisah Ibu yang Terpisah dari 7 Anaknya Selama 38 Tahun karena G30S/PKI Halaman all". KOMPAS.com (in Indonesian).
- Alifah, Nanda (2021-02-11). "7 Hal Tentang Reza Rahadian, Sang Aktor dengan 1000 Wajah". detikhot (in Indonesian).
