= Acoma Party =

Acoma Party Partai Acoma
- Leader: Ibnu Parna
- Founded: 8 August 1952
- Dissolved: 1965 (banned)
- Headquarters: Djalan Kasin Kulon 26, Malang
- Ideology: Communism; National communism Marxism; Trotskyism; Tan Malaka Thought
- Political position: Left-wing to far-left
- International affiliation: International Secretariat of the Fourth International/United Secretariat of the Fourth International (1959-1965)

Election symbol
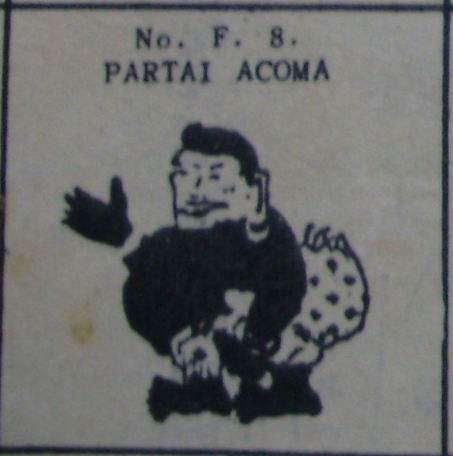

The Acoma Party (Indonesian: Partai Acoma) was a communist party in Indonesia. It evolved out of the Young Communist Force (Angkatan Comunis Muda, known by its acronym 'Acoma'). Acoma was converted into Partai Acoma on 8 August 1952. Acoma/Partai Acoma was led by Ibnu Parna.

Acoma developed as a communist youth group, founded in June 1946, whose cadres had not joined the Communist Party of Indonesia (PKI). It was largely made up by the remnants of the following of Tan Malaka. Acoma became part of the pro-Tan Malaka Revolutionary People's Movement (GRR).

Politically, Partai Acoma was close to the Murba Party. However some Acoma militants joined PKI, such as the Acoma leader Sidik Kertapati (who became a Central Committee member of PKI).

Partai Acoma constituted a minority faction in SAKTI, the Indonesian Peasants Union. The party was able to delay for two years the merger of SAKTI into the PKI-led peasants organizations.

In the 1955 parliamentary election, Partai Acoma got 64,514 votes (0.2% of the national vote). One parliamentarian was elected from the party, Ibnu Parna. After the election Ibnu Parna joined the National Progressive Fraction, a body of ten MPs from Java. In the Constituent Assembly, Acoma supported the Social-Economic bloc.

In the early 1950s, Partai Acoma began developing contacts with the Trotskyist International Secretariat of the Fourth International. In 1956 Ibnu Parna took part in the world congress of the International. In 1959 Partai Acoma was affiliated to the International Secretariat of the Fourth International as its Indonesian section.

In February 1959 Ibnu Parna was arrested for having denounced the rule of General Nasution in a pamphlet, in spite of having parliamentary immunity.

The party was banned in 1965. The party was targeted by the new Suharto regime. Ibnu Parna was killed in the mass killings of 1965.
