= League of Supporters of Indonesian Independence =

League of Supporters of Indonesian Independence Ikatan Pendukung Kemerdekaan Indonesia
- Abbreviation: IPKI
- Leader: Abdul Haris Nasution
- Founded: 20 May 1954 (original); 1994 (as mass organisation); 12 September 1998 (revival)
- Dissolved: 11 January 1973 (original); 1999 (revival)
- Ideology: Pancasila; Right-wing nationalism Third Way
- Political position: Right-wing
- Anthem: Garuda Pancasila

The League of Supporters of Indonesian Independence (Note: Also known as the League of Upholders of Indonesian Independence) (Indonesian: Ikatan Pendukung Kemerdekaan Indonesia, IPKI) was a right-wing nationalist political party in Indonesia established by former Army head General Abdul Haris Nasution as a vehicle for the Indonesian Army to enter the realm of politics. It was influential in persuading President Sukarno to introduce Guided Democracy in Indonesia and return to the 1945 Constitution.

== Establishment ==
Two years after his dismissal as Army Chief of Staff following the show of force known as the 17 October 1952 incident, General Abdul Haris Nasution established IPKI as an "army front organization" along with other military figures such as Gatot Soebroto and Azis Saleh, and with the support of the Yogyakarta sultanate. The party proposed a return to the spirit of the Proclamation of Independence and the 1945 Constitution as the way out of the political and economic problems that Indonesia had faced since independence. It also called for an end to corruption and for the "liberation of West Irian", still administered by the Dutch at the time.

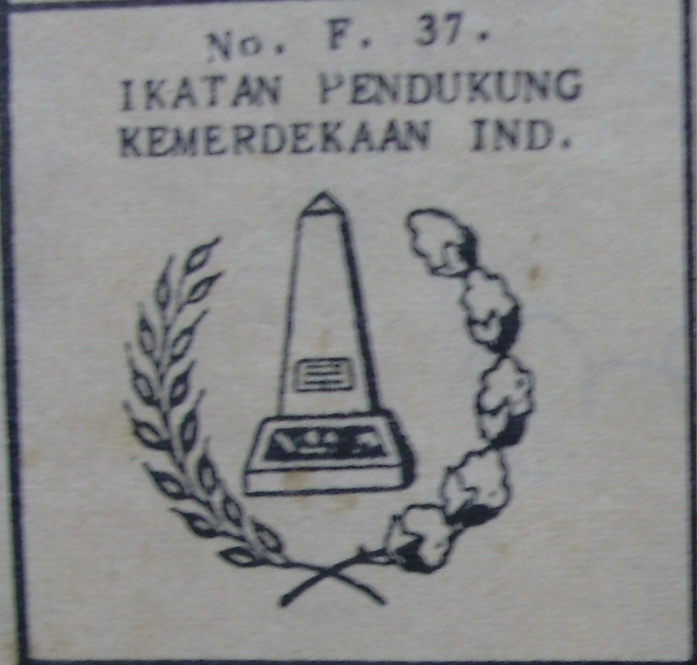
Symbol used on 1955 ballots

The party targeted military personnel and their families, and veterans, particularly in West Java and the outer (non-Javanese) islands. Although Nasution blamed the political parties for the state of the nation, he said that he did not want a military takeover. He also claimed that the Indonesian Constitution in force at the time was "too western". However, the cabinet saw IPKI as a threat, and tried to shackle it by demanding that Army officers resign if they intended to stand in the 1955 elections for the members of the People's Representative Council or Constitutional Assembly.

In the legislative elections, the party put forward 167 candidates in 11 of the 16 electoral districts, but won only 1.4% of the vote, giving it four of the 167 seats in the People's Representative Council. The vast majority of its vote, 81.7%, came from West Java because of support from the Siliwangi Division.

== Guided Democracy to the New Order ==
IPKI representative Dahlan Ibrahim served as minister for veteran affairs in the Second Ali Sastroamidjojo Cabinet, but in December 1956 the party withdrew him in protest at the inability of the government to deal with a series of regional rebellions led by disaffected army personnel, which would eventually lead to the PRRI Rebellion. The party also called for the cabinet to resign and be replaced by one led by former vice-president Mohammad Hatta. These rebellions caused the cabinet to collapse, and be replaced by the Working Cabinet, in which Azis Saleh served as minister of health.

Meanwhile, the Constitutional Assembly, formed to draft a permanent constitution, became bogged down over the issue of the role of Islam. By 1959, IPKI was publicly calling for a return to the original 1945 Constitution, and at a conference that year, asked President Sukarno to reimpose it by decree if the Assembly was unable to do so. In June, IPKI formed the "Front for the Defence of Pancasila" from 17 small parties and began a boycott of the Assembly. It subsequently managed to persuade the Indonesian National Party (PNI) and the Communist Party of Indonesia (PKI) to join the boycott, which meant the Assembly could no longer function. On 5 July 1959, President Sukarno reimposed the 1945 Constitution by decree, and also dissolved the Constitutional Assembly.

On 5 March 1960, Sukarno suspended the legislature and announced he would appoint a body to replace it, which would be known as the People's Representative Council of Mutual Assistance (Indonesian: Dewan Perwakilan Rakyat Gotong Royong, DPR–GR). This body would not include the smaller parties, and in any case, IPKI would no longer be necessary since the Army would be given seats of their own. However, Nasution managed to persuade Sukarno not to ban IPKI, and it was subsequently given seats.

As the Guided Democracy period continued, IPKI began to oppose Sukarno, and by the end of 1966 it joined the chorus of parties calling for a new political order. Five years after the 30 September Movement coup attempt that led to Sukarno's downfall and the start of the New Order regime, IPKI was one of nine parties that together with the Suharto regime vehicle Golkar contested the 1971 legislative elections. It won less than one percent of the vote, and no legislative seats. In 1973 IPKI was fused into the Indonesian Democratic Party. In its 1994 congress, it decided to become a non-political mass organisation.

== Revival and dissolution ==
On 12 September 1998, following the fall of the New Order, IPKI declared itself as a political party known as the League of Supporters of Indonesian Independence Party. Its aims included implementing and applying the state philosophy of Pancasila in daily life in order to realise national aims. The party program called for putting sovereignty back in the hands of the people, limiting the presidency to two terms and striving for regional autonomy. It supported the continuation of a social-political role for the Indonesian armed forces and for the president to be elected by the People's Consultative Assembly. The party won 0.22 percent of the vote, giving it one seat in the People's Representative Council. As it did not win enough votes in this election to take part in the 2004 vote, along with seven other parties, it merged into the Indonesian Unity Party.

== Election results ==
=== People's Representative Council ===
Election	Party leader	Votes	% of votes	Seats
1955	Abdul Haris Nasution	541,306	1.43%	4 / 257
1971	Hasyim Ning	338,403	0.62%	0 / 360
1999		328,564	0.31%	1 / 462

=== Constitutional Assembly ===
Election	Party leader	Votes	% of votes	Seats	Bloc
1955	Abdul Haris Nasution	544,803	1.44%	8 / 514	Pancasila Bloc
