= Soedjono Prawirosoedarso =

Javanese Spiritual Teacher and former member of parliament

Raden Soedjono Prawirosoedarso
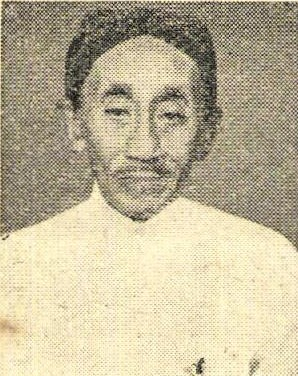

Member of the People's Representative Council
- In office 24 March 1956 – 22 May 1957

Personal details
- Born: April 15, 1875 Sumberumis, Madiun, Dutch East Indies
- Died: October 25, 1961 (aged 86) Sukerejo, Madiun, Indonesia
- Party: Independent

Raden Soedjono Prawirosoedarso (15 April 1875 – 25 October 1961) was an Indonesian politician and spiritual teacher. He was a member of the People's Representative Council from 1956-1957.

== Early life ==
Soedjono Prawirosoedarso was born in Sumberumis, 15 April 1875. His father name was Raden Ngabei Kertokusumo. Soedjono was the 17th generation of Prabu Wijaya and the 13th generation of Ki Ageng Pamanahan. He was a 3rd-grade elementary school graduate; he finished it in 1893.

== Career ==
=== Early career ===
He worked at Karasidenan Yogyakarta Office as an intern in 1896. In 1902, he became an opium seller in Yogyakarta for three years. Afterward, he moved to Jepara in 1905 and worked as a farmer in Mount Muria slope. From 1907-1916, he served for K.M.T Koesoemotojo from 1907 to 1916. Soedjono joined Sarekat Islam in 1910 and left the organization ten years later when SI was divided into two blocs.

=== Spiritual teacher ===
In 1916, he moved to Babadan and worked as a farmer. The same year he moved to Madiun and started to learn mysticism, ilmu sejati, under the guidance of K.H Samsudin in Betet from 1916-1919. Subsequently, he became a spiritual teacher in Babadan. He taught mysticism and wird to his followers.

In 1925, he moved to Sukerejo and continued to work as a farmer. In the same year, he founded Perguruan Ilmu Sejati in Caruban, Madiun on 12 October 1925. He gained many students from his teaching and by 1955, there were 100.000 people who became his followers.

=== Parliament ===
In the 1955 election, Soedjono Prawirosoedarso was elected as a member of DPR with total vote of 53,306. At the age of 81, he was the oldest member of DPR. Hence, his age made him appointed as the acting speaker of the People's Representative Council in 1956. After he stepped down from acting chairman of DPR, he joined the progressive faction.

Due to his old age, he resigned from his position as a member DPR on 22 May 1957 and was replaced by Mr. Soehardjo.

== Late life ==
After he resigned from DPR, he returned and stayed in Sukorejo, Madiun to work as a spiritual teacher. He died at noon on 22 October 1961 in Sukorejo. The next day, he was buried in a noble cemetery in Kuncen, Madiun.

== Gallery ==
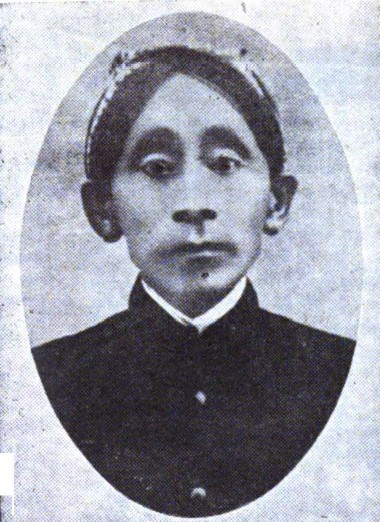
Soedjono Prawirosoedarso as a spiritual teacher.

== Bibliography ==
- Parlaungan (1956). Hasil Rakjat Memilih Tokoh-tokoh Parlemen (Hasil Pemilihan Umum Pertama - 1955) di Republik Indonesia. Jakarta: C.V. GITA.
- Rochmad, Rochmad; Setiawan, Muhammad Nurrosyid Huda; Pradhana, Faisal Reza; Untung, Syamsul Hadi (2021). "Dinamika Perkembangan Aliran Kepercayaan Di Kecamatan Pudak Kabupaten Ponorogo". Kalimah. 19 (1).
- Suciati, Suciati (2010). Strategi Komunikasi Departemen Kebudayaan dan Pariwisata dalam Membina Aliran Kepercayaan di Indonesia. Yogyakarta: Samudra Biru.
