= Islamic Tharikah Unity Party =

Former Islamic political party in Malaysia

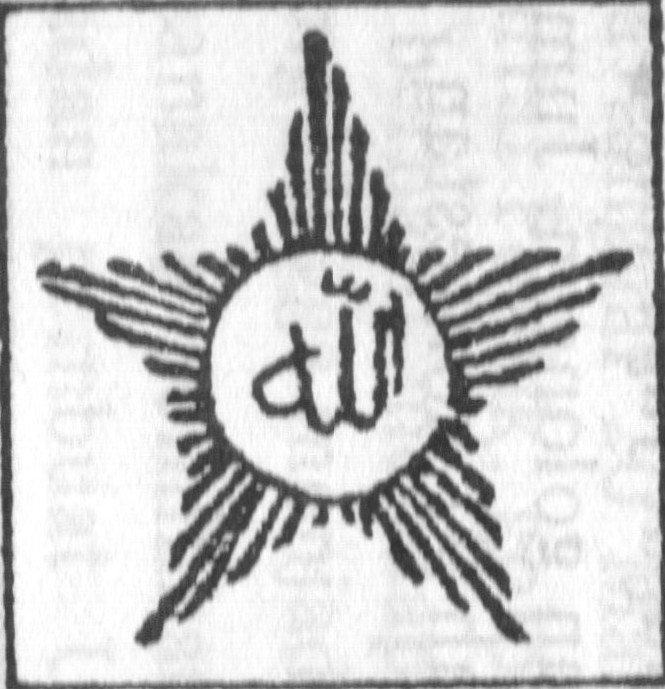
Party logo

The Islamic Tharikah Unity Party (Indonesian: Partai Persatuan Tharikah Islam, PPTI) was an Islamic political party in Indonesia. In the 1955 parliamentary election, PPTI got 85,131 votes (0.2% of the national vote). One parliamentarian was elected from the party.
