= Islamic Victory Force =

Former political party in Indonesia

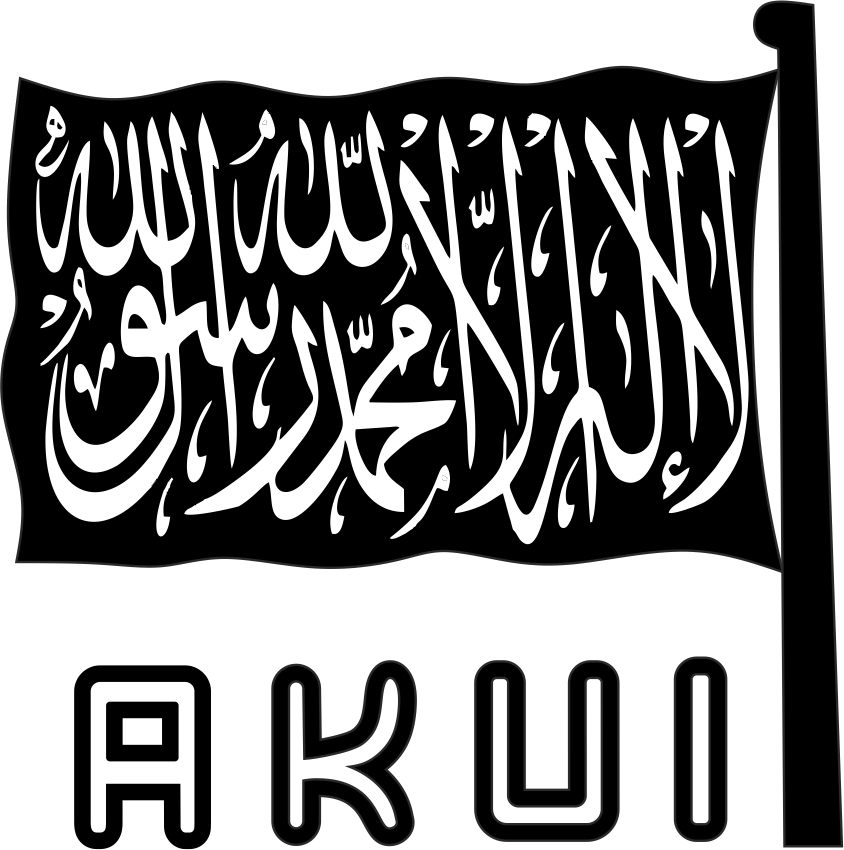
AKUI election symbol, 1955

The Islamic Victory Force (Indonesian: Angkatan Kemenangan Umat Islam, or AKUI) was an Islamic political party in Indonesia. The party was based in Madura. In the 1955 parliamentary election, AKUI got 81,454 votes (0.2% of the national vote). One parliamentarian was elected from the party.
