= Basuki Probowinoto =

Indonesian politician

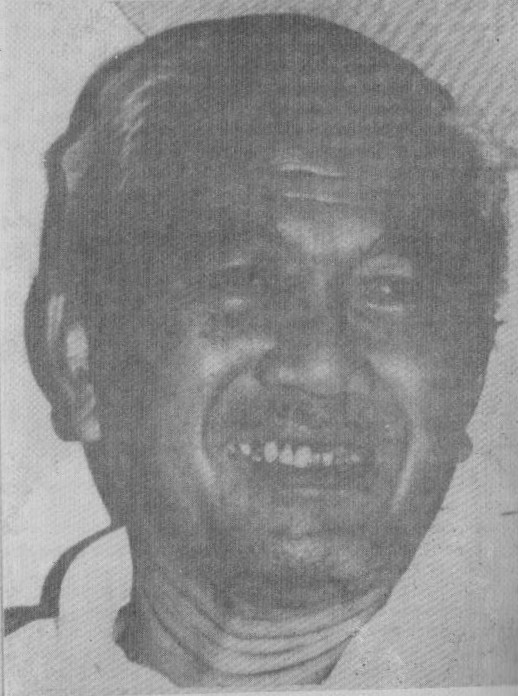

2nd Chairman of Indonesian Christian Party
- In office 7 December 1945 – 9 April 1950
- President: Sukarno
- Preceded by: Wilhelmus Zakaria Johannes
- Succeeded by: Johannes Leimena

Member of Central Indonesian National Committee
- In office 27 November 1945 – 15 February 1950
- President: Sukarno

Personal details
- Born: January 19, 1917 Tlogomulyo, Purwodadi, Central Java, Dutch East Indies
- Died: January 6, 1989 (aged 71) Jakarta, Indonesia
- Party: Indonesian Christian Party
- Parents: Mateus Rahmat (father); Rokayah (mother)

Basuki Probowinoto (January 19, 1917 – January 6, 1989) was the founder and chairman of the Indonesian Christian Party, and a reverend from the Javanese Christian Church. He was also a member of the Central Indonesian National Committee since 1945.

== Early life ==
Basuki Probowinoto was born on January 19, 1917, in Tlogomulyo, Purwodadi, Central Java, Dutch East Indies. He was born to father Mateus Rahmat and mother Rokayah. Since he was in school, Probowinoto frequently leapt class. After he finished his basic studies, he went on to the teacher's school in Purwodadi. After finishing his studies there, he entered the theological school. Prior to his entry into the school, he was requested to teach in the schools of Purwodadi, and invited to preach in local churches.

During his time in the theological school, his teacher, Professor Verkuyl, considered him as a nationalist thinker. Verkuyl stated that Probowinoto had a holistic approach, and considered him as a "religious man who is interested in nation-building and church development". After he finished his theological school, he went to Jakarta to serve in the Javanese Christian Church, which his teacher said "had urgent and complex matters".

== Japanese occupation ==
During the Japanese occupation of the Dutch East Indies, Probowinoto was accused of cooperating with the Dutch. To cope with the accusation, Probowinoto maintained a good relationship with the Japanese, with the help of a Japanese reverend. The relationship was used to deliver evidence about the cruelty of the Japanese Army in Indonesia and to explain the position of Christianity during the occupation more objectively. With his connection, he managed to gather several Christian figures in Indonesia to form an organization for the independence struggle of Indonesia.

== In the Javanese Christian Church ==
After the independence, Probowinoto was chosen as the General Secretary of the Javanese Christian Church. Under his leadership, the Javanese Christian Church implemented the "partnership in obedience" idealism by pairing Indonesian and Dutch workers as colleagues. These select foreign fraternal workers were able to supply technical leadership in education, social rehabilitation, and leadership training. More western women are attached to the operations of this church today than to any other church body in Indonesia. On the staff, or under appointment, are several from the Netherlands, England, the United States, the Philippines, New Zealand, and Australia.

== Political career ==
=== In the Indonesian Christian Party ===
Probowinoto was the delegate from the Javanese Christian Church during the meeting discussing the formation of the party on 9 November 1945. He was chosen as the chairman of the party at its first congress in Surakarta. He was chosen as the representative of Parkindo in the Central Indonesian National Committee since its third session in November 1945. After the dissolution of the committee in 1950, he was chosen as a member of the Regional People's Representative Council in Central Java and Salatiga, and later as a member of the Temporary People's Representative Council. He was the chairman of the Regional People's Representative Council of Salatiga, from 1951 until 1954.

== Proposal as National Hero of Indonesia ==
Probowinoto was proposed as the National Hero of Indonesia by the Christian University of Satya Wacana and the Indonesian Communication Foundation in the symposium "Tracing the Roots of the Thoughts and Phenomenal Works of Reverend Basuki Probowinoto". Both organizations stated that they had made a recommendation to the government to make Probowinoto the National Hero of Indonesia. The consideration was due to his creation of the Christian Scouting, Satya Wacana Christian University, and his works that were made through the Javanese Christian Church and Indonesian Christian Party. Probowinoto died on January 6, 1989, in Jakarta, Indonesia.
