= Manuel Sondakh =

Former Indonesian politician

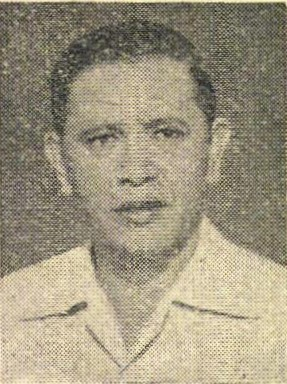

5th General Secretary of Indonesian Christian Party
- In office 5 February 1961 – 11 February 1962
- President: Sukarno
- Preceded by: Hadrianus Sinaga
- Succeeded by: Christoffel Joseph Mooy

Member of the People's Representative Council
- In office 24 March 1956 – 26 June 1960
- President: Sukarno

Member of the People's Representative Council of Mutual Assistance
- In office 26 June 1960 – 15 November 1965
- President: Sukarno

Personal details
- Born: December 25, 1905 Motoling, Manado, Dutch East Indies
- Died: November 18, 1984 (aged 78) Jakarta, Indonesia
- Resting place: Motoling, Manado, North Sulawesi, Indonesia
- Party: Free Indonesia Movement Party (1947-1950); Indonesian Christian Party (1952–1973)
- Education: People's School; Theological School; Teacher's School

Manuel Sondakh (December 25, 1905 – November 18, 1984) was a member of the People's Representative Council. He was chosen as the 5th general secretary of the Indonesian Christian Party at its 7th congress. He was also a priest, and became the vice chairman of the Minahasa Evangelical Christian Church from 1948, and since 1950 until 1955 he became the chairman of the church. As a politician, he was the member of the Regional People's Representative Council of Minahasa from 1947 until 1952, and from 1952 until 1954, he became its chairman.

He became controversial for his concurrent position as a teacher, priest, CEO, and a legislative member.

== Early life ==
Manuel Sondakh was born in Motoling, Manado, on December 25, 1905. He went to the People's School for his elementary school, and later he went to the Theological School and the Teacher's School to finish his higher studies.

== Career ==
=== Teacher ===
He began his job by teaching in the Tomohon Theological School from 1932 until 1948, and became the school rector from 1948 until 1952.

=== Priest ===
His theological career begin in 1948 when he was chosen as the vice head of the Minahasa Evangelical Christian Church from 1948 until 1950. He became the head of the church in 1950 and 1955. Concurrently, the church was the majority stockholder in the Poigar company, a coconut company. Sondakh became the chairman of the company, as he was the chairman of the church. Due to his concurrent position as the head of the church and the chairman of company, Sondakh was criticized by the congregation of the church and the society.

== Political career ==
=== In the Indonesian Independence Movement ===
Sondakh became active in the movement by becoming its chairman from 1947 until 1950. Prior to his election as the chairman of the party, he had already become the member of the Minahasa Regional People's Representative Council from 1937 until 1952, and from 1952 until 1954 he became the speaker. His involvement in both the church and the legislative made him apply the same organization to both. He managed to organize the Minahasa government by forming the "Wedana Assistant" to supervise Minahasan figures that were close to the government.

During the days of the United States of Indonesia, Sondakh was nominated as the candidate for the East Indonesia state council in the South Minahasan state district in the 1949 East Indonesian general election. He lost the election to Jan Maweikere, chairman of the Twaalfde Provincie (transl. Twelve Provinces) party. Sondakh obtained 32,146 votes, while Maweikere obtained 33,115 votes.

=== In the Indonesian Christian Party ===
Sondakh entered the Indonesian Christian Party in 1952. After his entry, he was chosen as the chairman of the North Sulawesi branch of the party. In the 1955 Indonesian legislative election, Sondakh was chosen as the member of the People's Representative Council of the North and Central Sulawesi electoral district. After the legislative formed by the election was dissolved, Sondakh was chosen as the member of the president chosen People's Representative Council of Mutual Assistance on 26 June 1960. He ended his membership on 28 October 1971, after the legislative formed by the 1971 Indonesian legislative election was installed.

Sondakh was chosen as the general secretary of the Indonesian Christian Party at its 7th congress from 4–5 February 1961 in Jakarta.

== Death ==
Manuel Sondakh died in Jakarta on 18 November 1984 and was buried in his hometown, Motoling.
