= Christoffel Joseph Mooy =

Indonesian politician

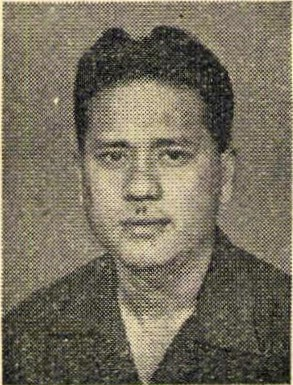

6th General Secretary of Indonesian Christian Party
- In office 11 February 1962 – 22 October 1967
- President: Sukarno; Suharto
- Preceded by: Manuel Sondakh
- Succeeded by: Sabam Sirait

Member of the People's Representative Council
- In office 24 March 1956 – 26 June 1960
- President: Sukarno

Personal details
- Born: February 10, 1921 Kupang, Timor, Dutch East Indies
- Died: August 12, 1971 (aged 50) Cikini Hospital, Jakarta, Indonesia
- Party: Indonesian Christian Party
- Spouse: Paulina Susana Mboeik (m. 1951)
- Education: People's School; Technical School; High School; Indonesian Student Association Training, Cimahi

Military service
- Allegiance: Indonesia
- Rank: First Lieutenant
- Commands: 28th Brigade of the Indonesian National Armed Forces

Christoffel Joseph Mooy (February 10, 1921 – August 12, 1971) is a member of the People's Representative Council of Indonesia. He was chosen as the 6th general secretary of the Indonesian Christian Party at its 8th congress.

== Early life ==
Christoffel Joseph Mooy was born in Kupang, Timor, Dutch East Indies, on February 10, 1921. He went to the People's School for his elementary school, and later he went to the Technical School and High School to finish his higher studies.

== Military career ==
He was a first lieutenant infantry personnel from the 28th Brigade of the 3rd Military Regional Command.

== Political career ==
=== In the Indonesian Christian Party ===
In the 1955 Indonesian legislative election, Mooy was elected as the member of the People's Representative Council from the East Nusa Tenggara electoral district. He ended his membership on 26 June 1960, after the formation of the People's Representative Council of Mutual Assistance, in which he wasn't chosen by the president to seat the legislative.

Mooy was chosen as the general secretary of the Indonesian Christian Party at its 8th congress from 8–11 February 1962 in Yogyakarta.

== Family ==
Mooy was married to Paulina Susana Mboeik. He married her on 25 April 1951.

== Death ==
Christoffel Joseph Mooy died in Jakarta on August 12, 1971, at the Cikini Hospital.
