= Uksw =

UKSW may refer to:

- Cardinal Stefan Wyszyński University (UKSW) in Warsaw, Poland
- Satya Wacana Christian University (UKSW) in Salatiga, Central Java, Indonesia
