= Albert Mangaratua Tambunan =

Indonesian politician

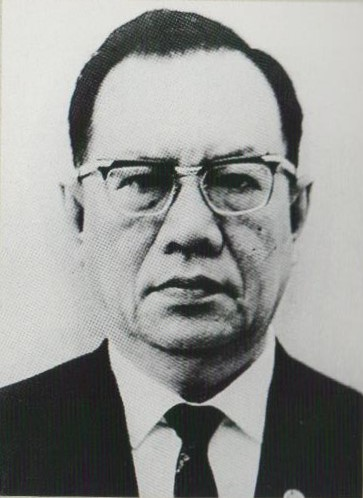

18th Minister of Social Affairs
- In office 28 July 1966 – 12 December 1970
- President: Sukarno; Suharto
- Preceded by: Muljadi Djojomartono
- Succeeded by: Mohammad Syafa'at Mintaredja

4th Chairman of Indonesian Christian Party
- In office 5 February 1961 – 22 October 1967
- President: Sukarno; Suharto
- Preceded by: Johannes Leimena
- Succeeded by: Melanchton Siregar

2nd General Secretary of Indonesian Christian Party
- In office 7 December 1945 – 24 March 1947
- President: Sukarno
- Preceded by: Maryoto
- Succeeded by: Martinus Abednego

Deputy Speaker of the People's Representative Council
- In office 15 February 1950 – 26 Mar 1956 Serving with Arudji Kartawinata (February 1950–1956); Tadjuddin Noor (August 1950–1956)
- President: Sukarno
- Speaker: Sartono

Member of the People's Representative Council
- In office 26 Mar 1956 – 26 June 1960
- President: Sukarno

Personal details
- Born: 25 September 1910 Tarutung, North Sumatra, Dutch East Indies
- Died: 12 December 1970 (aged 60) Jakarta, Indonesia
- Party: Indonesian Christian Party (1945–1970)

Albert Mangaratua Tambunan (25 September 1910 – 12 December 1970) was the chairman and the general secretary of the Indonesian Christian Party, and the first deputy speaker of the People's Representative Council, serving for two terms. He was also famous for being the only Christian representative in the Working Body of the Central Indonesian National Committee.

== Early life ==
Albert Mangaratua Tambunan was born in Tarutung, North Sumatra, Dutch East Indies on 25 September 1910. He went to the high school of law in 1940. After finishing his study, he went to work at the Jakarta High Court as a clerk, and as a judge in the Cirebon High Court.

== Political career ==
=== In the Indonesian Christian Party ===
Tambunan begin his career in the Indonesian legislative when he was chosen in the Working Body of the Central Indonesian National Committee as a regional delegation on 27 November 1945. He became its member until the dissolution of the committee. He went to be the deputy speaker of the People's Representative Council of the United States of Indonesia, and the Provisional People's Representative Council. In the 1955 Indonesian legislative elections, he was elected as the member of the People's Representative Council from Parkindo, representing North Sumatra electoral district.

Tambunan was chosen as the general secretary of the Indonesian Christian Party at its first congress from 6–8 December 1945 in Surakarta. He handed the position to Martinus Abendego after he was rechosen as the Central Indonesian National Committee in 1947. Seventeen years later, he was chosen as the chairman of the party at its 7th congress.

== As Minister of Social Affairs ==
Tambunan served as the Minister of Social Affairs for three terms, in the Ampera Cabinet, Revised Ampera Cabinet, and the First Development Cabinet. During his term, Tambunan emphasized the development of the Village Social Institution (Indonesian: Lembaga Sosial Desa, LSD) as the instrument for social development. He also proposed the creation of old-age insurance for the people of Indonesia. Tambunan went to West Germany and India, and in 1968, he attended the International Conference of Social Ministers in New York.

== Family ==
Tambunan had one wife and three children (two boys and a daughter).

== Death ==
Tambunan died at the Cendrawasih Pavilion of the Dr. Cipto Mangunkusumo Hospital. He died on 12 December 1970 at 04.15 after being treated since 2 December due to heart complications, nerve and lungs inflammation.
