= Timeline of the Indonesian Christian Party =

This is a timeline of events in the Indonesian Christian Party from its formation in 1945 until the merger in 1973.

== Timeline ==
=== 1945 ===
| Date | Event |
|---|---|
| 17 August | The proclamation of the independence of Indonesia. |
| 18 August | The ratification of the Constitution of Indonesia. Sukarno and Mohammad Hatta are chosen as the President and Vice President. |
| 3 November | The Government Decree "On the Recommendation of the Formation of Political Parties". Multiparty system begins in Indonesia. |
| 4 November | The Union of Indonesian Christian Youth is formed. The movement would become the Indonesian Christian Youth Movement in 1963. |
| 6 November | General Meeting of Christians in Indonesia to celebrate the proclamation of the independence of Indonesia and the explanation to the Constitution of Indonesia. |
| 10 November | Declaration of the National Christian Party, later Indonesian Christian Party, in Jakarta. Wilhelmus Zakaria Johannes is chosen as the temporary chairman. |
| 6–7 December | The 1st Congress of the National Christian Party in Surakarta. The name of the party was changed to Indonesian Christian Party and abbreviated as Parkindo. |

=== 1946 ===
| Date | Event |
|---|---|
| 28 February | The Indonesian Christian Women's Association is established in Solo. |
| 1 November | The Parkindo Library is opened in Jogjakarta, at Gondokusuman Street number 37. |

=== 1947 ===
| Date | Event |
|---|---|
| March | The session of the Central Indonesian National Committee in Malang. During this session, the party begins to establish connection with a similar party, the Parki (Partai Kristen, Christian Party), which is located in Sumatra. The 2nd Congress of the Indonesian Christian Party in Surakarta. |
| 19–20 April | The congress of the Christian Party in Parapat, North Sumatra. At this congress, Parki fuses into the Indonesian Christian Party. |

=== 1950 ===
| Date | Event |
|---|---|
| 9 February | The Indonesian Christian Student Movement is established in Jakarta as the continuation to the Christilijke Studenten Vereninging (CSV), which was established in Kaliurang on 28 December 1932. |
| 7–9 April | The 3rd Congress of the Indonesian Christian Party in Surakarta. The congress is attended by delegates from the party branches outside Java. |
| 10 April | The Central Executive Council meeting establishes: 1. The office of the Central Executive Council in the Kramat Raya street number 65, Jakarta; 2. The head of office is J.P. Nunuhitu.; 3. The periodical head is Johannes Leimena. |
| May | Ir. Sitompul visits South Sumatra. |
| 25 May | The Indonesian Church Council is established. |
| June | Drs. Frits Kilian Nicolas Harahap visits South Sumatra. |
| 9 July | The Central Executive Council of the party holds a meeting with the Indonesian Church Council, Indonesian Christian Women's Association, Indonesian Christian Youth Movement, Indonesian Christian Student Movement, and MPKO. Only the Indonesian Christian Women's Association and the Indonesian Christian Youth Movement openly supports the party as an organization. |
| October | Sumarto visits Kalimantan. |

=== 1951 ===
| Date | Event |
|---|---|
| October | The Political Party course is attended by 50 persons. Materials: 1. Albert Mangaratus Tambunan: Constitution and Law; 2. Sumarto: Labor; 3. Fkn. Harahap: Christianity and Communism; 4. M. Hutasoit: Sociology; 5. Johannes Leimena: Pancasila; The Kemudi magazine began to be published by the CEC of Parkindo. Sumarto was chosen as its chief editor. |

=== 1952 ===
| Date | Event |
|---|---|
| 10-13 April | The 4th Congress of the Indonesian Christian Party in Malang. |
| April | Parkindo has recorded a total of 150 branches, with 10 in West Java, 21 in Central Java, 19 in East Java, 14 in Sumatra, 51 in Kalimantan, 16 in Sulawesi, 16 in Sunda Kecil, and 3 in Ambon, with a total of 320,000 members. |

=== 1954 ===
| Date | Event |
|---|---|
| 15-19 April | The 4th Congress of the Indonesian Christian Party in Medan. |

== Bibliography ==
=== Main source ===
- Simorangkir, J.C.T. (1989), Manuscript Sejarah Parkindo [Manuscript of the History of Parkindo] (in Indonesian), Jakarta: Yayasan Komunikasi, pp. 9–23
