= Hadrianus Sinaga =

Eighth minister of health of Indonesia

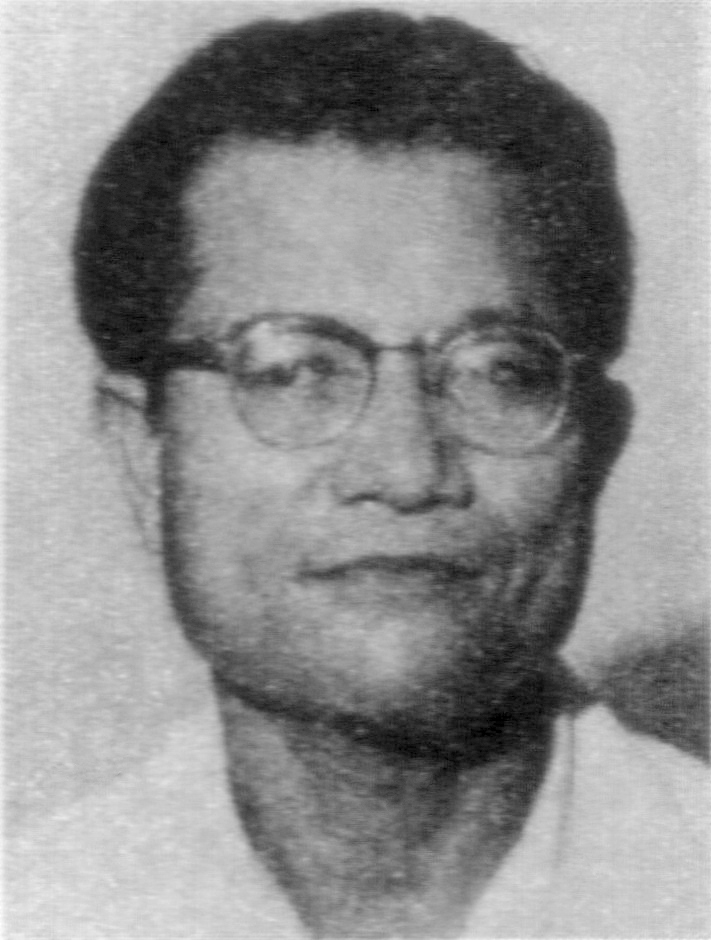

6th Minister of Health
- In office 24 March 1956 – 9 April 1957
- President: Sukarno; Suharto
- Preceded by: Johannes Leimena
- Succeeded by: Abdul Azis Saleh

Member of the People's Representative Council
- In office 15 February 1950 – 8 December 1954
- President: Sukarno

4th General Secretary of Indonesian Christian Party
- In office 9 April 1950 – 5 February 1961
- President: Sukarno
- Preceded by: Martinus Abednego
- Succeeded by: Manuel Sondakh

Personal details
- Born: 15 June 1912 Hatoguan, Samosir Island, Dutch East Indies
- Died: 11 June 1981 (aged 68) Jakarta, Indonesia
- Resting place: Kalibata Heroes' Cemetery, Jakarta, Indonesia
- Party: Indonesian Christian Party (1945–1973)

Hadrianus Sinaga (15 June 1912 – 11 July 1981) was the eighth minister of health of Indonesia. He was also the member of the People's Representative Council from 1950 until 1954. He was also the third general secretary of the Indonesian Christian Party. He was a surgeon, and established of the Medical Faculty of the Christian University of Indonesia.

== Early life ==
Hadrianus Sinaga was born in Hatoguan, Samosir Island, Dutch East Indies, on 15 June 1912. He went to the Dutch East Indies Doctors' School in Surabaya, and finished his studies in 1942.

== Career ==
After finishing his studies, he became a doctor in Panyabungan, South Tapanuli, and as the Head of Health Affairs of the Tapanuli Residency, the head of health affairs of the Defense Council of Tapanuli, and the head of health affairs of the People's Safety Forces.

== Political career ==
=== In the Indonesian Christian Party ===
From 1947 until 1949, Sinaga was chosen as the member of the Central Indonesian National Committee. He was chosen as the member of the People's Representative Council of the United States of Indonesia, and the Temporary People's Representative Council, until 8 December 1954, when he resigned.

Sinaga was chosen as the 3rd general secretary of the Indonesian Christian Party at its 3rd congress from 7–9 April 1950 in Jakarta.

== As the Minister of Health ==
Sinaga was chosen as the minister of health in the Second Ali Sastroamidjojo Cabinet. During his tenure he initiated the building of a regional hospital in Samosir, with the funds from UNICEF. Several years after his death, government changed the name of the hospital to his name. The street in front of the hospital was also changed to his name.

== Death ==
Hadrianus Sinaga died in Jakarta on 11 July 1981. He was buried at the Kalibata Heroes' Cemetery in Jakarta.
