= Monique Rijkers =

Indonesian and pro-Israel activist

- Born: 1 April 1973 (age 53); Ujung Pandang (now Makassar), South Sulawesi, Indonesia
- Education: Satya Wacana Christian University
- Known for: pro-Israel activism

Monique Rijkers (born 1 April 1973) is a Christian Indonesian and pro-Israel activist. She was born in Ujung Pandang and is the founder of the non-profit organization Hadassah of Indonesia, a foundation that educates about diversity, especially regarding Jews and Israel. Her surname is Rondonuwu-Mandagie, and she lives in Jakarta. She is known to have met Israeli Prime Minister Benjamin Netanyahu in October 2017 at the Christian Media Summit. Currently, She is one of the administrators of the YouTube channel FaktaIsrael.

== Education and career ==
She studied industrial microbiology at Satya Wacana Christian University, Salatiga. She then became active in journalistic activities. She has been working as a journalist for 14 years and has received 10 journalism awards. She has visited 36 countries, including the Silk Road Expedition, the Jewish Tour in Poland and Prague, and 3 times to Israel. In 2016, she founded the Tolerance Film Festival.

== Views ==
=== Israel-Palestine conflict ===
During the 2021 Palestine-Israel crisis, she proposed on her personal Facebook account the relocation of Gaza residents to Indonesia and settling them in a place to be named Gaza, where it will become the 35th province of Indonesia. She added that many Indonesians loved and donated to Gaza. She also suggested Gaza to be ruled by Egypt while leaving the West Bank to Fatah since it did not launch missiles to Israel.
