= Arrow Division =

- Divisi Panah
- Active: 1945
- Disbanded: 1949
- Country: Indonesia
- Allegiance: Indonesian Christian Party
- Branch: Army
- Engagements: Operation Product; Operation Kraai

Commanders
- Commander: Col. Melanchton Siregar

The Arrow Division was the military division of the North Sumatra branch of the Indonesian Christian Party during the Indonesian National Revolution. The division was established shortly after the independence of Indonesia to anticipate the incoming Dutch Army. The division was active in Tapanuli. The division became well known in Pematangsiantar due to the divisions' all out defense against the massive Dutch army that managed to broke through the fortifications of Medan Area Lembung.
