= Indonesian Christian Party 1945 =

Indonesian Christian Party 1945 Partai Kristen Indonesia 1945
- Abbreviation: Parkindo 45
- Chairman: Max Nikijuluw
- Founded: 5 July 2000
- Preceded by: Indonesian Christian Party
- Succeeded by: Indonesian Students Party (disputed)
- Headquarters: Jakarta
- Ideology: Pancasila
- Religion: Christianity (Protestant)

Indonesian Christian Party 1945 (Indonesian: Partai Kristen Indonesia 1945, Parkindo 45) was a political party in Indonesia. The party was a successor to the Indonesian Christian Party, which was established in 1945. The party never passed the verification for the general election.

After long absence in national politics, the Ministry of Law and Human Rights announced that it has recognised Indonesian Students Party as the successor of Parkindo 45 on 21 January 2022, and all administrative requirements for the change has been fulfilled.

The ministry's stance is not recognised by Parkindo 45 members, who promptly contested the decision. They claimed the change occurred without their prior knowledge, while also alleging foul play in the succeeding party's registration process. However, Indonesian Students Party Chairman Eko Pratama claimed in July 2022 that the issue with Parkindo 1945 has been settled.
