= Indonesian Students Party =

Indonesia Students Party Partai Mahasiswa Indonesia
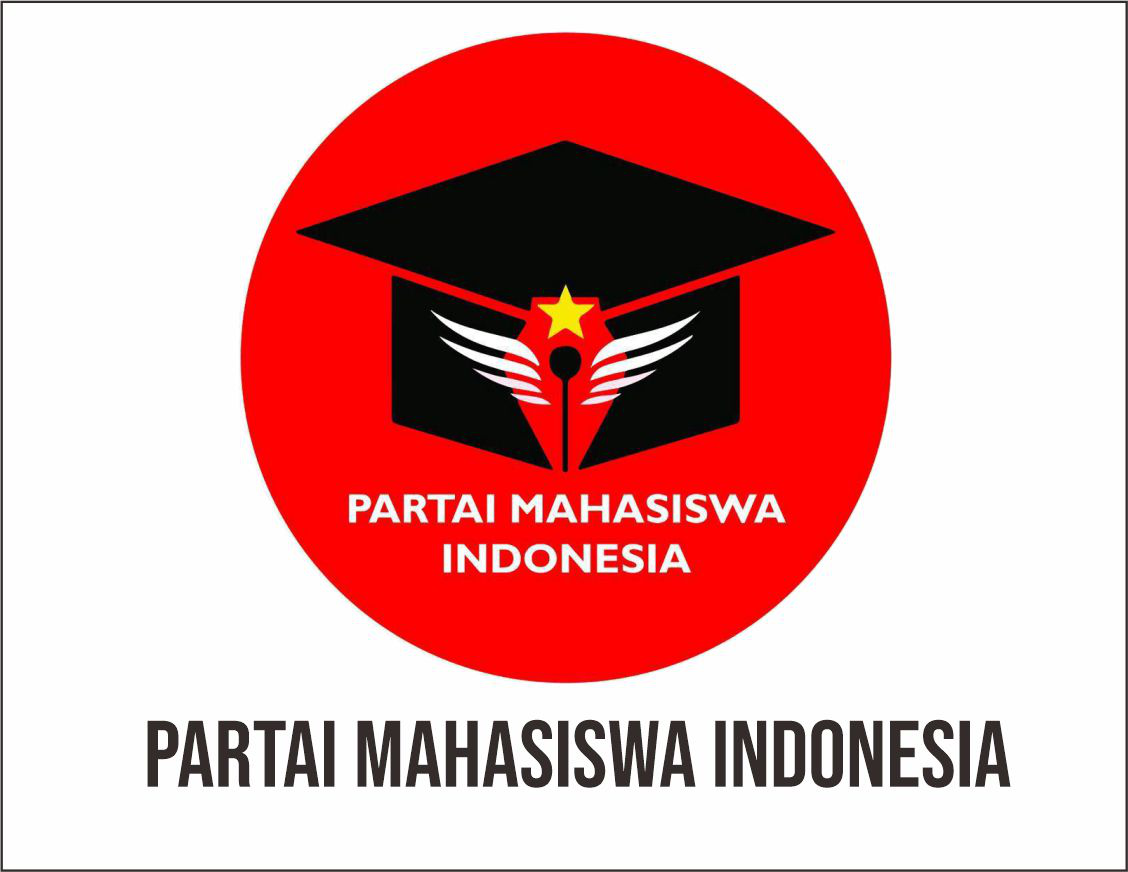
- Abbreviation: PMI
- Chairman: Eko Pratama
- Secretary-General: Mohammad Al Hafiz
- Treasurer: Muhammad Akmal Mauludin
- Founded: January 21, 2022; 4 years ago (legal recognition)
- Headquarters: Cikini, Menteng, Jakarta
- Ideology: Pancasila; Social democracy Secularism
- Political position: Centre-left
- DPR seats: 0 / 580
- DPRD I seats: 0 / 2,372
- DPRD II seats: 0 / 17,510

Indonesian Students Party (Indonesian: Partai Mahasiswa Indonesia, PMI) is a minor political party in Indonesia which focuses on youth politics. The party claimed themselves as the successor of the Indonesian Christian Party 1945 (Parkindo 1945). The party is led by Eko Pratama, the leader of student executive board confederation BEM Nusantara.

== History ==
An invitation for the declaration of a new political party with the name Indonesia Students Party circulated in September 2022. The invitation gave the declaration date on 3 September 2021 and location at the General Elections Commission office in Jakarta. No further information was known about the party declaration event.

The party's eventual existence was revealed to the public, albeit in an unusual manner, on 21 April 2022, when DPR-RI Deputy Speaker Sufmi Dasco Ahmad announced that he had an audience with some minor parties, and he named Indonesia Students Party as one of the party.

The Ministry of Law and Human Rights later confirmed that the party had been legally recognised on 21 January 2022, as the successor of Indonesian Christian Party 1945 (Parkindo 1945). However, the ministry's stance was contested by original members of Parkindo 1945 who claimed the change occurred without their prior knowledge, while also alleging foul play in the party registration process.

During the party congress in July 2022, the party decided not to register for the 2024 election as resources would be focused instead to provide political education to the public. The party would seek electoral presence only in 2029 when it become matured. At the same congress, Pratama claimed that the issue with Parkindo 1945 has been settled.

== Party organisation ==
- Chairperson:
  - Eko Pratama
- Secretary General:
  - Mohammad Al Hafiz
- Treasurer:
  - Muhammad Akmal Mauludin
- Party Court Chair:
  - Teguh Stiawan
- Party Court members
  - Davistha A.
  - Rican

== Response to party founding ==
Indonesian Students Party is not universally welcomed by university students ought to be the party's main basis, and students executive boards of various universities perceived the party do not represent their struggle.

Student executive board confederation BEM Seluruh Indonesia rejected the new party as they believed students' movement is inherently extra-parliamentary, hence, diminishing the need to establish a political party for students. Meanwhile, Ridho Alamsyah, the central secretary of the rival faction of BEM Nusantara who opposed Pratama, believed that the party could gag students' movements and making it vulnerable to be swayed by interest groups through financial means, and the party must disband immediately.
