= 2022 Indonesian student protests =

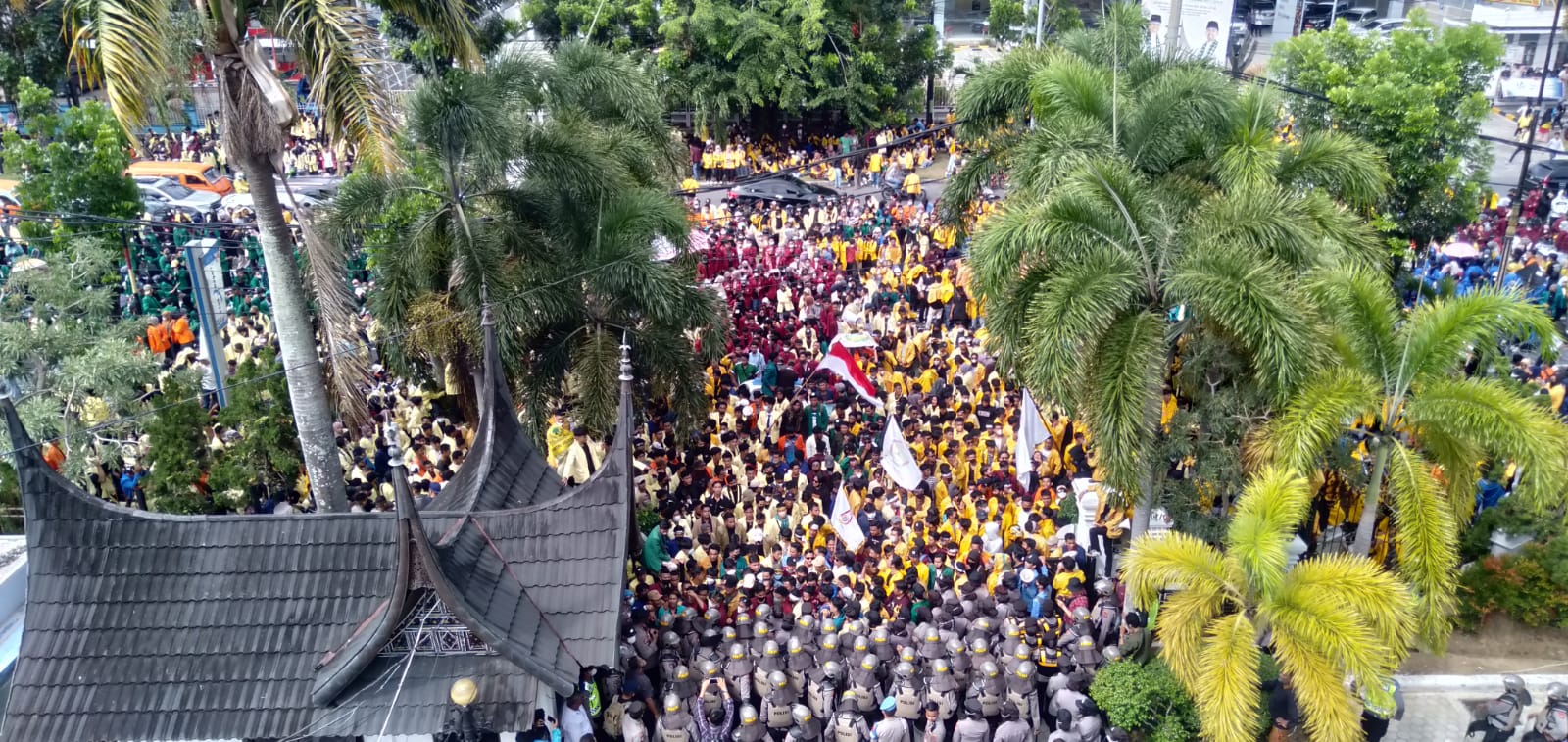
- Date: First protest: 11 April 2022; Third protest: 5 September 2022
- Caused by: Rumours regarding delay of 2024 election; Rumours regarding Joko Widodo seeking third term; Rising price of groceries and cooking oil; Rising fuel price
- Goals: See § Demands
- Result: Government officially announced the election will be held as scheduled on 14 February 2024

Parties
Students; Labour union; Taxi drivers (since September 2022)	Government

Lead figures
Uncentralized leadership	(Indonesia) Joko Widodo

Casualties and losses
	1 police officer died

The 2022 Indonesian student protests, also known as the 11 April demonstrations (Indonesian: Demo 11 April), were a series of protests led mostly by students throughout Indonesia. They were triggered by rumours regarding a delay of the 2024 election and proposals of amending the Constitution to allow President Joko Widodo to have a third term. They drew attention to food prices and the rising price of cooking oil in Indonesia. They were conducted mostly by university and college students in major cities across the country, and much of the organizing was done by the All-Indonesian Students' Union (BEM-SI).

The main protests were preceded by a split between BEM-SI and BEM Nusantara, another student alliance, with some separate protests trying to distance themselves from BEM-SI despite similar goals and demands.

== Background ==
=== Rumours of third period and delay of 2024 election ===
Several prominent politicians and members of parliament had previously voiced support of the rumours to extend Joko Widodo's term through constitution amendment. The support also came from Golkar, National Awakening Party, and National Mandate Party.

Although the incumbent president Joko Widodo denied his support of third period of terms of office on 15 March, the students that were involved in the protests rejected Jokowi's denyings. Jokowi also denied rumous about potential election delay and stated that the election will be held on 14 February 2024. Despite his statements, the students stated that they will still hold the protest regardless and did not believe in Jokowi's statements of denying these rumours.

== Demands ==
The All-Indonesian Students Executive Body (BEM SI) revealed four new demands of the 11 April protests, in addition to the previous six demands of the 28 March protests and twelve of 21 October 2021:

#Urging and demanding the people's representatives to hear and submit people's aspirations, not the political party's aspirations.

1. Urging and demanding the people's representatives to pick up people's aspirations as when mass protests were done in various regions from 28 March 2022 to 11 April 2022.
2. Urging and demanding the people's representative to not betray the state constitution by making amendments, be firm against 2024 election delayings or 3 periods of terms of office.
3. Urging and demanding the people's representative to submit a review of (the previous) 18 demands by students to the president, which were still unanswered at mid-April 2024.

There are some controversies about the original demands of the 11 April protests. The protests originally demanded the resignation of the incumbent president Joko Widodo. Adian Napitupulu, a politician from the Indonesian Democratic Party of Struggle, stated that the posters featuring such demands were hoaxes. Ismail Fahmi, the founder of Drone Emprit and Media Kernels Indonesia, alleges that the hashtags demanding of Jokowi's resignation, #TurunkanJokowi (#DeposeJokowi) and #GoodbyeJokowi were made by certain groups to benefit from the protests.

BEM SI, the organizer of the protests also stated that they had not demanded Jokowi resign. Another students organization Indonesian Students Alliance (AMI) conducted protests on 21 April and demanded seven new demands:

#Act decisively on the constitution's bandits and reject extension proposal of the president's terms of office

1. Decrease the price of goods and overcome the economical inequality

== Protests ==
=== Java ===
In Jakarta, the protests were originally used to be held in the Arjuna Wijaya Horse Statue area at the National Monument, but the All-Indonesian Students Executive Body (BEM SI) moved the protests to the MPR/DPR Building, because the protesters do not want to be criminalized. One day before the protests held, symbolic protests were held at the Arjuna Wijaya Horse Statue by Indonesian Students Alliance (AMI). The students involved in the protests were from 18 campuses.

The protesters were also putting banners in front of MPR/DPR building containing texts such as "OnlyFans [cases handled] quickly, cooking oil mafias [handled] slowly" in reference to the pornography case involving Gusti Ayu Dewanti (often known as Dea OnlyFans). Ade Armando attended the protests to make content on CokroTV, a pro-government propaganda YouTube channel connected to Indonesian Solidarity Party, but later he was injured on the protests.

In Surabaya, protests resumed on 14 April with 4,000 law enforcement personnel guarding the area.

=== Sumatra ===
A demonstration occurred in the city of Padang, joined by thousands of students from various universities such Andalas University and State University of Padang.

In Medan, North Sumatra, the protest was originally scheduled on 11 April and organized by the United Students Executive Body Alliance of North Sumatra, but later cancelled.

=== Kalimantan ===
Protests occurred in several major cities such as Banjarmasin, Palangka Raya, and Samarinda. In Samarinda, hundreds of students who joined the Alliance of East Kalimantan Residents Suing (Mahakam Alliance) were making crowds at the Islamic Center, before protesting at the front of the Regional People's Representative Council of East Kalimantan office.

In Central Kalimantan, protests were planned in the city of Palangka Raya, East Kotawaringin Regency, and Kapuas Regency. As a result, police in the respective regions tightened the security preparations there. In Palangka Raya, students who identified themselves under Palangka Raya Cipayung Plus Alliance blockaded sections of the main road inside the city in front of the Central Kalimantan People's Representative Council, and burned tires. The students demanded the government stabilise cooking oil prices, lower fuel prices, and cancel the recent addition of an 11% value-added tax.

A protest by students occurred in Tarakan, North Kalimantan, on both 11 April and 12 April. However, on 12 April, the continuation protest was delayed to the next day.

In Pontianak, West Kalimantan, the student protests mostly focused on issue of third term rumours and rising fuel prices. The protest was held in front off West Kalimantan People's Representative Council building. However, not all universities or colleges participated in the protest. Head of student's executives body of Keling Kumang Technology Institute in Sekadau Regency, said that they will not participate in the protest and that Jokowi's statements rejecting extension of his term and delaying election is sufficient.

=== Sulawesi ===
In Kendari, Southeast Sulawesi, dozens of students from Haluoleo University led by field coordinator Umar Walengke, said that they will get involved in the protests at 11 April 2022.

In Palu, Central Sulawesi, students also held protests. After around two hours of demonstrations, they were allowed to get inside the Central Sulawesi People's Representative Council building. The students that held protests were from Tadulako University, Alkhairaat University, Datokarama State Islamic University and Palu Panca Bhakti Economic College. Around 500 personnel in the city were deployed to guard the protest.

A major protest also occurred in Manado, North Sulawesi on 12 April 2022 with similar demands. However, the organizer in Manado stated that they are not affiliated with the 11 April demonstrations organized by BEM-SI and instead affiliated with BEM Nusantara. They specifically chose a different date to avoid association with BEM-SI protests that were perceived as having too much vested interest in it.

In Gorontalo city, Gorontalo, the regional police command of the province banned all police personnel from bringing firearms while guarding the protest to avoid violence. The protest occurred around the Gorontalo governor's office building. Protests in Gorontalo province were held by students in three locations, which are Gorontalo city, Gorontalo Regency, and Boalemo Regency. The protests were relatively peaceful except in Gorontalo Regency where the students pushed themselves inside the parliament building, forcing security forces to form a blockade.

Protests in Mamuju, West Sulawesi were held peacefully by students. The student demands aside of rejecting the third term and election delay includes urging the government to repeal law regarding new capital relocation and Omnibus Law on Job Creation, as well as demanding the government to pass long-awaited bills such as Bill on Indigenous Society, Bill on Archipelagic Region, and Bill on Sexual Violence.

=== Nusa Tenggara and Bali ===
A demonstration occurred in the city of Kupang, organized by students from various universities in East Nusa Tenggara province. The students rejected the addition of 11% VAT, rising fuel prices, and demanded the government stabilise the cooking oil prices. The students also invited regular civilians to participate in the protest. In Kalabahi, Alor Regency, students under name of Cipayung Plus Alliance and Alliance of Alor Marching Front (FMRB) sealed the regency's parliament building due to no representative showing up. The protest almost turned violent but later the tension eased after the seal opened. The students planned to occupy the building and sleep there until their demands were heard.

Another protest also occurred in Mataram and Bima, West Nusa Tenggara, resulting in meeting between the provincial parliament and the students from the protest. The police guarding the protest were prohibited from bringing firearms and the protest were relatively peaceful.

=== Maluku and Papua ===
Demonstrations also occurred in Ternate and Ambon. In Ambon, there were three main locations of the protests which were the University of Pattimura, the governor's office building, and the Maluku People's Representative Council building. The students at Ambon's demands were a rejection of election delay, rejection of an additional third term for the president, and government control of the high price of groceries and fuel. They later held a congregation prayer in front of the Maluku People's Representative Council building. Speaker of the provincial parliament, Lucky Wattimury, later met the students to hear their demands.

In Ternate, protests by students also occurred, resulting in joint deployment of 600 police and military personnel . Protests were also held in Masohi, Central Maluku Regency by Alliances of Students Executive Bodies of Central Maluku. The protests were concentrated in the town center in front off Masohi Plaza and the Jl. Abdullah Soulissa, with their main demand rejecting extension of Jokowi's presidency with a third term. The students there argued that extension of Jokowi's term is against the Constitution of Indonesia, in addition to demands for subsidies for fuel due to rising prices and to stabilise grocery prices in the marketplace. The protest were relatively peaceful and they disbanded themselves after being heard by Central Maluku People's Representative Council.

Protests also occurred in Sofifi, Tidore, Tobelo, and Jailolo. The protest in Ternate turned violent later and six students were later arrested. In Sofifi, the protest were relatively peaceful and focused on fuel, cooking oil, as well as grocery prices without demands regarding third presidential term extension. In Tidore city, the students under name of BARATIB Alliance (Barisan Rakyat Tidore Bergerak, lit: People's of Tidore Marching Front) held a convoy from the front of Nuku University with orations regarding rejecting Joko Widodo's third term, rising fuel and cooking oil prices, as well as new VAT policies that are perceived as harmful to the people. Ali Ibrahim, mayor of the city later supported the students demands after meeting with them.

== Reactions ==
As of 11 April 2022, the local police forces had arrested dozens of students at the Bogor railway station and Baranangsiang terminal who were allegedly attending the protests. They were from senior high schools and vocational schools outside Bogor, including those from Sukabumi, West Java.

The provincial education office of Jakarta requested teachers to not allow school students to participate in the protests. Although BEM SI is involved with the protests, the public relations bureau head of Students Executive Body of the University of Indonesia (BEM UI), Navio, stated on 10 April that his organisation did not participate in the protests, but was instead organizing the People's Congress and national mass protests for 21 April.

Following the widespread protests, Joko Widodo again repeated his statements that he rejects any delay of 2024 election and did not seek to extend his term. Political parties that previously supported the rumour also pulled their support for election delay following the protests.

There is another plan for hold student protest on 21 April 2022. However, after BEM-SI central coordinator Kaharuddin spouted his pro-New Order narration and views and also supporting New Order revival and return on air in a televised interview, this resulted public to question the real motivation behind the student protests. As the result of the controversy, BEM-SI finally pulled itself from the future protests.
