= Martinus Abednego =

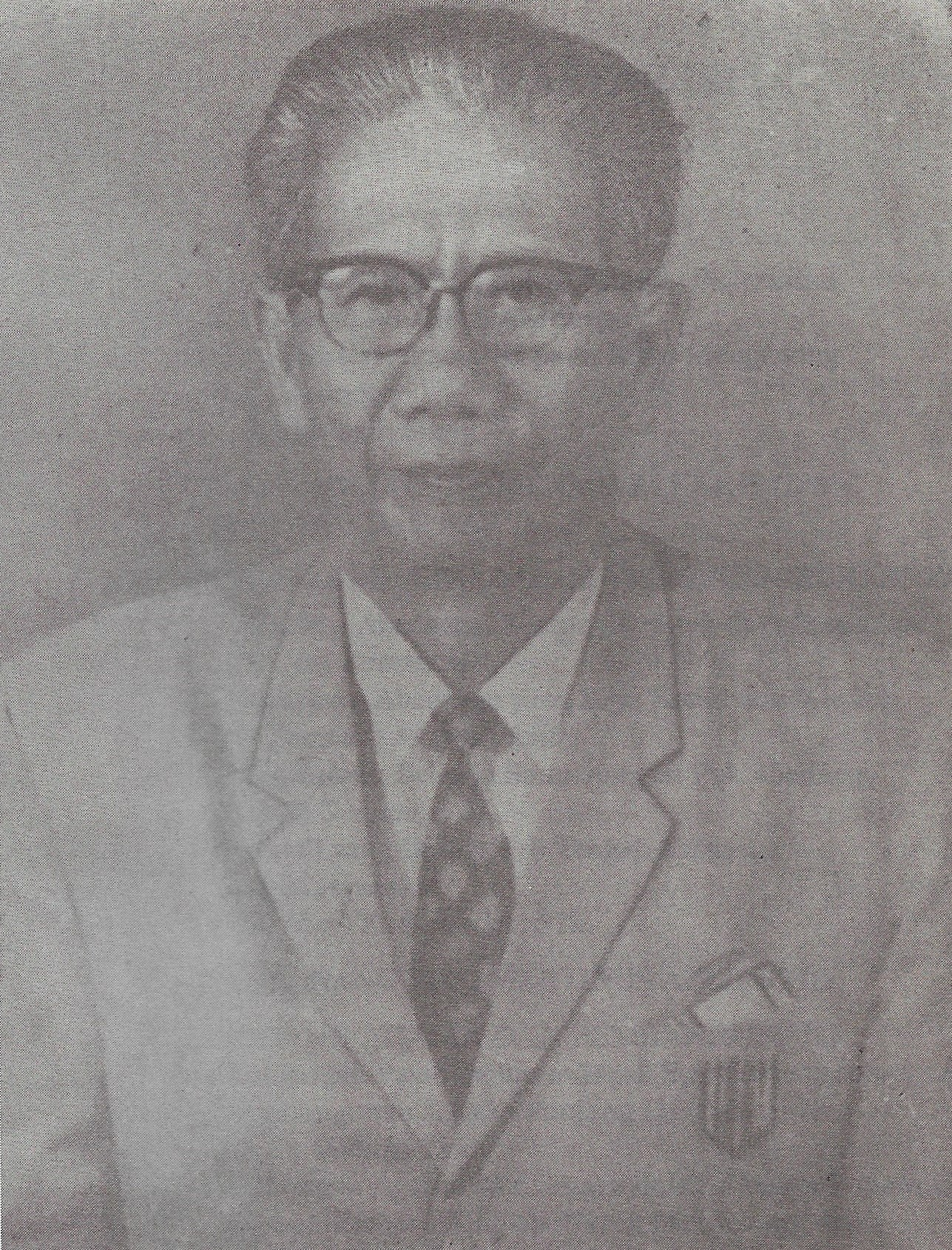

1st Director General for Guidance of the Christian Community
- In office 25 March 1946 – 1973
- President: Sukarno; Suharto
- Preceded by: office created
- Succeeded by: Nehemia Harefa

Member of the Central Indonesian National Committee
- President: Sukarno

3rd General Secretary of Indonesian Christian Party
- In office 24 March 1947 – 9 April 1950
- President: Sukarno
- Preceded by: Albert Mangaratua Tambunan
- Succeeded by: Hadrianus Sinaga

Personal details
- Born: March 10, 1910 Citeureup, Bogor, Dutch East Indies
- Died: May 9, 1976 (aged 66) Jakarta, Indonesia
- Party: Indonesian Christian Party
- Awards: 2nd Class Satyalancana Karya Satya (1971)

Martinus Abednego (10 March 1910 – 9 May 1976) was a politician from the Indonesian Christian Party who served as the first Director-General for Guidance of the Christian Community, which was a directorate-general under the Ministry of Religious Affairs. He was also a member of the Central Indonesian National Committee and the 3rd General Secretary of the Indonesian Christian Party.

== Early life ==
Martinus Abednego was born in Citeureup, Bogor, Dutch East Indies, on March 10, 1910. He was born as the first child of a Christian primary school teacher named Djoni Abednego, and his wife named Satinem Kaiin.

Martinus was raised in the middle of a devout Christian family. He was enrolled at the Christelijke Hollands Chinese School (HCS), a school for Chinese children. Even though Abednego was Sundanese, he managed to be entered the school due to the help of his father's friend.

Due to his father's work, which obliged him to move from place to place, Abednego frequently changed school. Although he has to adapt to the new condition, his father always intended to find the best school existing. His elementary school was finished at the Europeesche Lagere School in Bogor. One of his friends was the child of the Governor-General of the Dutch East Indies, Johan Paul van Limburg Stirum.

After finishing his primary grade studies, Abednego planned to become a lawyer. His mother went against his plan, stating that a lawyer is the crookest occupation in the world. His mother encouraged him to become a teacher, and enrolled him at the Teacher's School in Solo.

After graduating from the Christelijke Hogere Kweek School (HKS, Teacher's School) in 1932, he went on to study at the Hoofdacte Cursus in Batavia until 1934.

== Career ==
=== Politics ===
Abednego was one of the founding members of the Indonesian Christian Party. He was appointed as the general secretary of the party in the 2nd congress of the party, replacing Albert Mangaratua Tambunan who had been appointed as the member of the Working Committee of the Central Indonesian National Committee (KNIP). The congress also appointed Abednego as the member of the KNIP.

After the headquarters of the party was moved to Yogyakarta, the position of the general secretary was handed over from Abednego to Raden Sumarto as acting general secretary.

During the Round Table Conference, Abednego was appointed as the general advisor for the Indonesian delegates.

=== Department of Religious Affairs ===
During the Japanese occupation of the Dutch East Indies, the Japanese formed the Syuumubu, or the Office for Religious Affairs. Abednego was appointed as one of the employees of the Syuumubu, focusing mainly on Christian affairs.

After the formation of the Ministry of Religious Affairs in Indonesia, Abednego was appointed as the head of the Bureau of Christian Affairs of the ministry. His appointment was due to his support to the formation of the ministry, even though most Christians in Indonesia didn't approve the formation of the ministry, mainly due to the fear of Islamic dominance in Indonesia.

During his career as the head for the Christian affairs in the ministry, Abednego increased the cooperation between the Ministry of Religious Affairs and the Council of Churches in Indonesia. The ministry managed to create the curriculum for Christian education, and published books for Christian schools in accordance with the curriculum.

He also managed to propose the revocation of the Article 177 of the Indische Staatsregeling (State Law of the Dutch East Indies), which stated that all Christian missionaries could only perform ministries of service after permitted by the Governor-General of the Dutch East Indies, and that the missionaries' activity was limited to a certain region. Abednego argued that such rule violates the freedom of movement and religion in Indonesia. The law was revoked several years after his proposal.

Under the pressure of the Council of Churches in Indonesia, the government officially banned the Jehovah's Witnesses in 1976. Even though this ban was concerned by Abednego as a deterioration of religious freedom in Indonesia, he eventually supported it, stating that the Jehovah's Witnesses teachings disturbed law and order in Indonesia.

He eventually resigned from the position in 1973.

== Family ==
During his study at the HKS, Abednego met a Javanese woman named Sri Muryan from Central Java. Abednego married Sri Muryan on 28 December 1937 in Klaten. The marriage resulted in seven children, all boys.

== Death ==
In July 1975, Abednego was rushed to hospital. He managed to recover several days later, and managed to wrote a memoir about his life. On 5 May 1975, he was rushed to the Cikini Hospital, where he died five days later.
