= List of members of the Supreme Advisory Council, 1968–1973 =

This is a list of members of the Supreme Advisory Council of Indonesia from 1968 until 1973.

== Legend ==
Died in office, date of death below
Resigned, date of resignation below
Added members, date of inauguration below

== Speakers and Deputy Speaker ==
| Speaker | Deputy Speaker |
| Wilopo | Muhammad Ilyas d. 30 December 1970 |

== Members ==
| Anwar Tjokroaminoto | Abdullah Udjong Rimba | Arudji Kartawinata d. 13 July 1970 | K.H. Ahmad Badawi d. 25 April 1969 |
| Hardi | Ipik Gandamana | Herman Johannes | I.J. Kasimo |
| Johannes Leimena | Maria Ulfah Santoso | Masjkur r. 13 January 1969 | Djamaluddin Malik; Replacing Masjkur d. 2 July 1970 |
| Pangeran Muhammad Noor | Sardjito d. 5 May 1970 | Slamet Iman Santoso | Sukarni d. 7 May 1971 |
| Mohammad Dahlan i. 15 September 1971 | M. Sarbini i. 15 September 1971 | | |
