= Sabam Sirait =

Indonesian politician (1936–2021)

- ᯘᯅᯔ ᯘᯪᯒᯤᯖ᯲
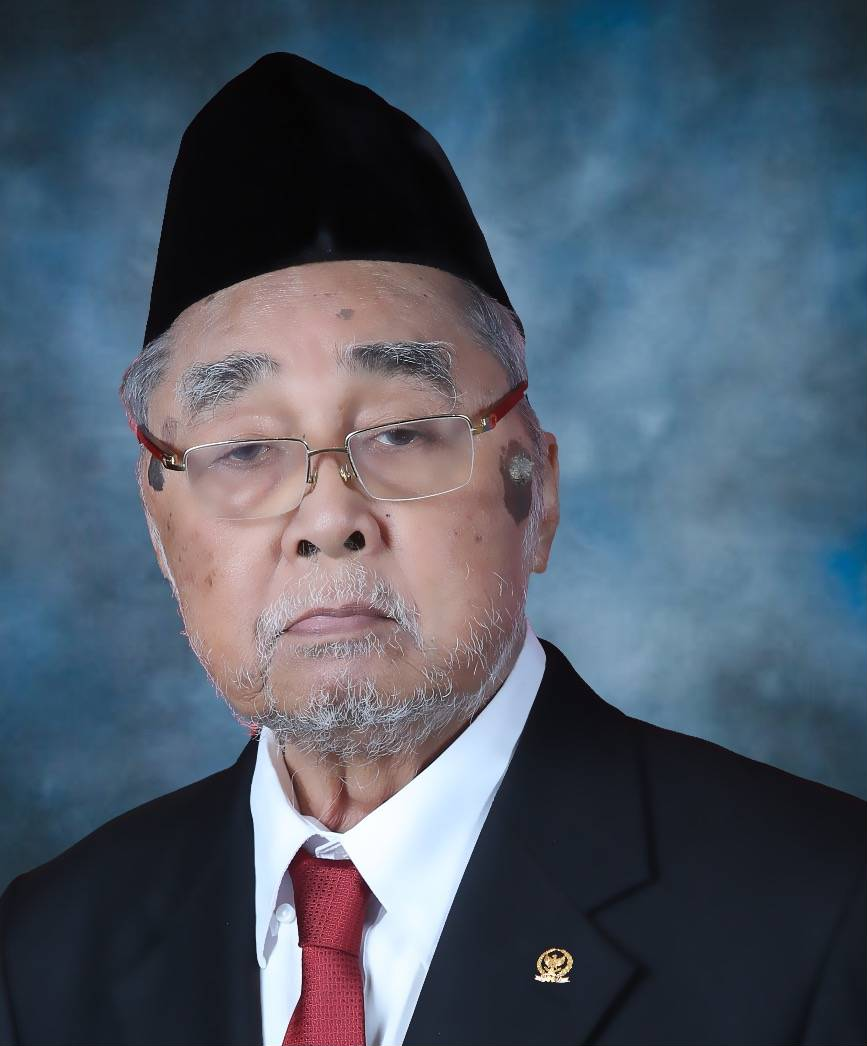
- Official portrait, 2019

Member of the Regional Representative Council
- In office 15 January 2018 – 29 September 2021
- Preceded by: A. M. Fatwa
- Constituency: Jakarta

Member of the House of Representatives
- In office 28 October 2005 – 1 October 2009
- Constituency: Jakarta
- In office 1 October 1999 – 1 October 2004
- Constituency: Irian Jaya
- In office 1 October 1992 – 1 October 1997
- Constituency: Irian Jaya
- In office 10 March 1973 – 1 October 1982
- Constituency: North Sumatra
- In office 1 February 1967 – 1 October 1971

Member of the Supreme Advisory Council
- In office 3 May 1983 – 1 October 1992
- President: Suharto

Secretary-General of the Indonesian Democratic Party
- In office 13 January 1973 – 18 April 1986
- President: Suharto
- Preceded by: Position established
- Succeeded by: Nico Daryanto

Secretary-General of the Indonesian Christian Party
- In office 17 October 1967 – 11 January 1973
- President: Sukarno; Suharto
- Preceded by: Christoffel Joseph Mooy
- Succeeded by: Position abolished

Personal details
- Born: 13 October 1936 Tanjungbalai, Sultanate of Asahan, Residency of Sumatra's East Coast, Dutch East Indies
- Died: 29 September 2021 (aged 84) Siloam Hospital, Tangerang, Indonesia
- Party: Parkindo (1960–1973); PDI (1973–1999); PDI-P (from 1999)
- Spouse: Sondang Bruder Sidabutar (m. 1969)
- Children: Maruarar Sirait; Batara Imanuel Sirait; Johan Bakti Porsea Sirait; Mira Sirait

Sabam Gunung Panangian Sirait (13 October 1936 – 29 September 2021) was an Indonesian politician who served as a member of the House of Representatives and the Regional Representative Council. Previously, he served as secretary-general of the Indonesian Christian Party and Indonesian Democratic Party. He is the father of politician Maruarar Sirait, who serves as minister of housing and settlement.

== Early life ==
Sabam Sirait was born on 13 October 1936, in Tanjungbalai, Sultanate of Asahan, Residency of Sumatra's East Coast, Dutch East Indies (present-day North Sumatra, Indonesia). His father, Frederick Hendra Sirait, was an employee in the Ministry of Public Works who would later become one of the founders of the Indonesian Christian Party (Parkindo). His mother, Julia Sibuea, was a rice trader.

== Political career ==
=== Indonesian Christian Party (1958–1973) ===
Sabam began his political career in 1958, while studying at the Faculty of Law of the University of Indonesia. His interest in politics grew after the dissolution of political parties by Sukarno in 1960. He was active as chairman of the Jakarta branch of the Indonesian Christian Student Movement (GMKI).

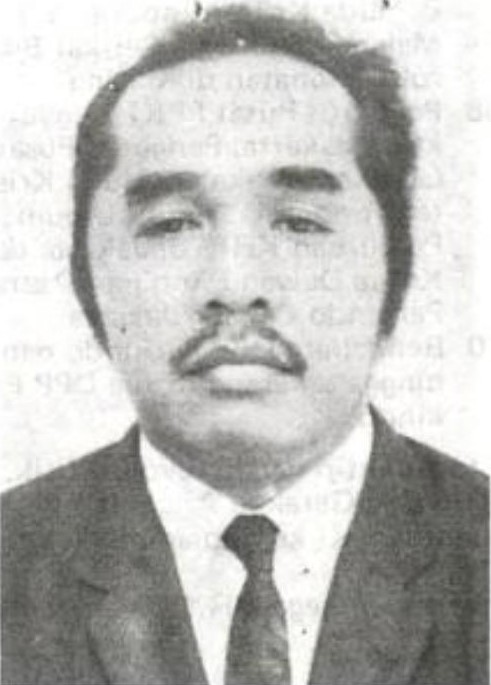
Sabam Sirait, c. 1971

After being the chairman of the Jakarta branch of the Indonesian Christian Student Movement (GMKI), he was invited by his father to join the Indonesian Christian Party (Parkindo). He quickly rose through the ranks: in 1961 he became the Vice General Secretary of Parkindo, and seven years later he became the General Secretary of the Party.

In 1965, a day after the September 1965 coup attempt, he was invited to discuss the crackdown on the Communist Party of Indonesia (PKI) by the Commander of the Indonesian Armed Forces as the representative of Parkindo. During the discussion, he argued that PKI should be disbanded, but not by fully entrusting the process to the Army. He argued that all of the elements of society should work together to overcome the situation. The argument was rejected by all of the representatives in the discussion, and the final decision was to fully entrust the crackdown of the PKI to the Armed Forces.

After Suharto became the president of Indonesia in 1967, he issued an order to simplify the political parties based on ideology. Originally, Parkindo and the Catholic Party were merged into a religious group and formed the United Development Party. After observing the dominance of Islam in the United Development Party, Sabam and other political figures of both parties rejected the merger and proposed to fuse into a new group, but this idea did not gain broad acceptance by other political figures. Finally, both parties were merged into the nationalist group.

As a result of this, on 7 March 1970, Sabam, along with other representatives from different parties, held a meeting to discuss the grouping of parties. A second meeting was held on 9 March 1970 to begin drafting a joint statement about the group. The joint statement was finished and reported to the president on 12 March 1970, which stated the willingness of the political parties in the nationalist group to work together for the development of Indonesia.

During the 1971 election campaign, Sabam was arrested twice. First, he was arrested by the police after being falsely reported for stating that "the Indonesian Army is a group of fascists". Second, he was arrested after organizing a demonstration with a group of student activists in Jakarta to oppose the construction of the Beautiful Indonesia Miniature Park (TMII) project which was deemed too costly by the demonstrators.

=== Indonesian Democratic Party (1973–1999) ===
After the merging of political parties into groups, the nationalist group including Parkindo was fused into the Indonesian Democratic Party (Partai Demokrasi Indonesia, or PDI) on 10 January 1973. Sabam signed the Fusion Declaration representing Parkindo. The result of the fusion was broadcast widely by the media, and three days later, the Central Leadership Council of the Indonesian Democratic Party was formed, with Sabam elected as the General Secretary of the party. The formation of the Central Leadership Council was ratified at the First Congress of the Indonesian Democratic Party on 11–13 April 1976.

==== Anti-monopoly law ====
During his office as a member of the People's Representative Council and the Supreme Advisory Council, Sabam was known for advocating against monopolies in Indonesia. He frequently brought up the matter in his first term as a member of the People's Representative Council, by drafting laws against monopolies. He was often laughed at by his colleagues when he brought up the matter.

Sabam raised the matter again when he became a member of the Supreme Advisory Council. In 1987, he had a debate about it for six hours with the Minister of Justice, Ismail Saleh, and the Director General of Corrections, Baharuddin Lopa. Eventually, all of them agreed that an anti-monopoly law was needed, and a letter was sent to the president about the anti-monopoly law. The law was ratified eleven years later, during the Indonesian financial crisis. He argued that had the law been ratified in 1987, Indonesia would have been able to avoid the financial crisis.

==== Indonesian general elections ====
In 1992, during a session chaired by the Speaker of the People's Representative Council Wahono, Sabam interrupted the session and proceeded to Wahono's table to ask for the amendment of the current Decree of the People's Representative Assembly about the general elections, which he deemed undemocratic. After the session, he was charged with subversion and anti-development.

=== Indonesian Democratic Party of Struggle (from 1999) ===
After the schism of the PDI, the party was divided into two factions headed by the government-backed Soerjadi and by Megawati respectively. Due to the alliance of his party with the PNI back in the 1970s, Sabam joined the Megawati faction. This choice led to him being interrogated by the government after the 27 July 1996 incident.

==== Support of Palestine ====
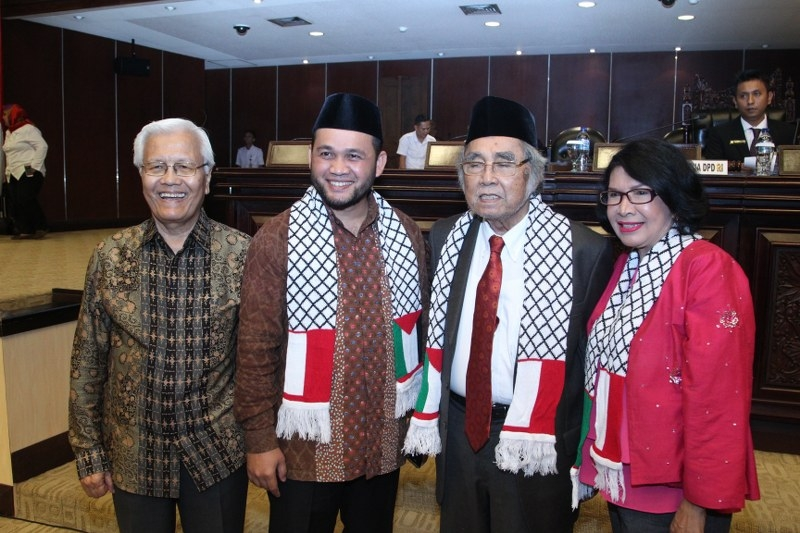
Sabam Sirait wore a scarf with the Palestinian flag to show his support for Palestine.

Sabam openly supported the recognition of Palestine and criticized Israel for frequent harassment of the Palestinian people. He believed that the suffering of the Palestinian people should be felt by all Indonesian people and Christian people. Since 2007, Sabam attended various demonstrations in support of the Palestinian cause, which were organized mostly by the Prosperous Justice Party. Sabam frequently lauded the party for its consistent support of the Palestinian cause through demonstrations and regular donations. Sabam also criticized his party and other parties that did not show support for the recognition of Palestine.

Sabam has frequently proposed to the government to name one of the streets in Jakarta in honor of Palestine.

==== Member of the Regional Representative Council ====
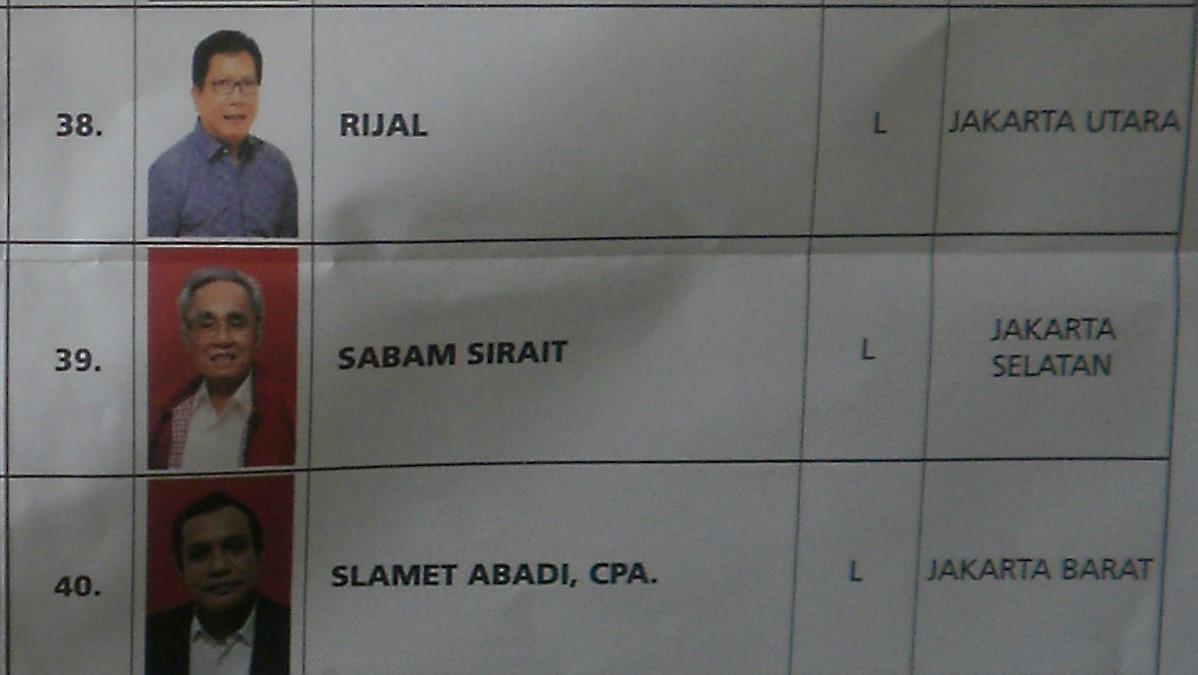
Sabam's ballot number was 39 as the candidate for the Regional Representative Council of Jakarta in 2019.

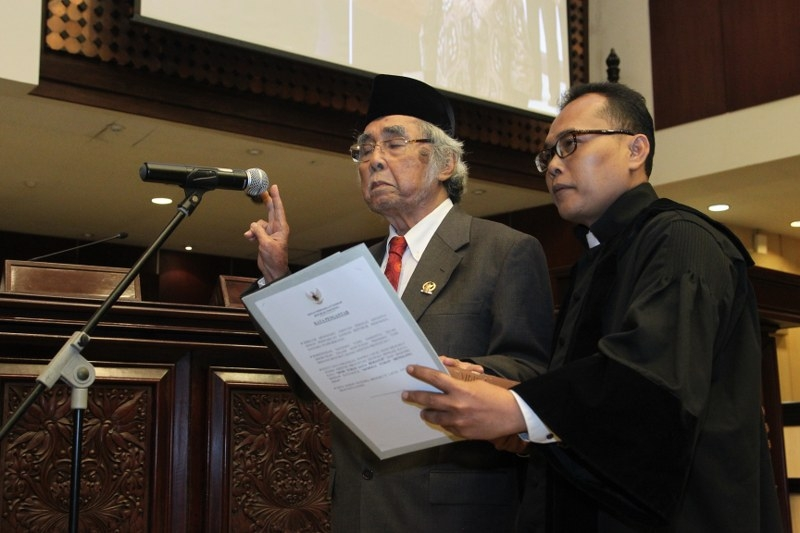
Inauguration of Sabam Sirait as a member of the Regional Representative Council.

Sabam contested the 2014 Indonesian legislative election as the candidate of the Regional Representative Council for the Jakarta constituency. Even though he came fifth with 237,273 votes, he was inaugurated as an ad interim member of the Regional Representative Council on 15 January 2018, replacing the late Andi Mappetahang Fatwa.

Sabam stood again in the 2019 Indonesian legislative election as a candidate of the Regional Representative Council for the Jakarta constituency. On the recapitulation of votes for the Regional Representative Council of Jakarta, Sabam Sirait came second with 626,618 votes, behind Jimly Asshiddiqie.

== Family ==
Sabam Sirait married Sondang Sidabutar, a doctor from the University of North Sumatra, on 25 March 1969. On the 50th anniversary of their wedding in Kartini Hall, Jakarta, Sabam released a book titled Berpolitik Bersama 7 Presiden (Politics with Seven Presidents). The wedding anniversary was attended by important figures, such as the Speaker of the DPR Bambang Soesatyo, Minister of Law and Human Rights Yasonna Laoly, and the Speaker of the Jakarta Regional DPR Prasetyo Edi Marsudi.

== Death ==
Sabam died in Siloam Hospital, Tangerang, on 29 September 2021 at the age of 84, two weeks short of his 85th birthday. The cause of his death was chronic lung illness.
