= Melanchton Siregar =

Colonel (Titular) Melanchton Siregar
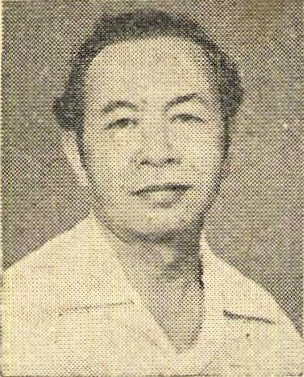

Deputy Speaker of People's Consultative Assembly
- In office 20 June 1966 – 28 October 1971
- President: Sukarno; Suharto
- Speaker: Abdul Haris Nasution
- Preceded by: Idham Chalid; Ali Sastroamidjojo
- Succeeded by: Sumiskum; Jailani Naro; Domo Pranoto; Mohammad Isnaeni

5th Chairman of Indonesian Christian Party
- In office 17 October 1967 – 11 January 1973
- President: Sukarno; Suharto
- Preceded by: Albert Mangaratua Tambunan
- Succeeded by: position abolished

Member of Central Indonesian National Committee
- In office 6 March 1947 – 15 February 1950
- President: Sukarno

Personal details
- Born: 7 August 1912 (Note: Other sources stated that the birth year was 1913.) Lumban Silo, Pearung, Paranginan, Humbang Hasundutan, North Sumatra, Dutch East Indies
- Died: 24 February 1975 (aged 62) Jakarta, Indonesia
- Resting place: Kalibata Heroes' Cemetery, Jakarta, Indonesia
- Party: Parki (1945–1947); Indonesian Christian Party (1945–1973)

Military service
- Allegiance: Indonesia
- Branch/service: Indonesian Army
- Years of service: 1947–1975
- Rank: Colonel (Titular)
- Commands: Arrow Division
- Battles/wars: Indonesian War of Independence

Melanchton Siregar (7 August 1912 – 24 February 1975) was the co-founder and last chairman of the Indonesian Christian Party, and the commander of the Arrow Division, the military wing of the North Sumatra branch of the Indonesian Christian Party. He was also the member of the Central Indonesian National Committee since 1947.

== Early life ==
Melanchton Siregar was born on 7 August 1912 in Lumban Silo, Pearung, Paranginan, Humbang Hasundutan, North Sumatra, Dutch East Indies. When he was eight years old, he entered the Gouvernment Hollandsch Inlandsch School in Balige, the elementary school provided by the Dutch for local Indonesians. After finishing his elementary school, he went to the Christelijke Meer Uitgebreid Lager Onderwijs in Tarutung, the junior high school for Christians.

He went to Java after his basic studies were finished. He studied in the Christelijke Hollands Indische Kweekschool (HIS) in 1935, and later in the Gouvernment Hoofdacte Cursus (GHS) in 1938. After obtaining diploma in the GHS, he went back to North Sumatra to fulfill his duty as the head of family, since his mother had died during his time in Java.

== Career ==
In North Sumatra, he began his career by teaching at the Joshua Institute in Medan for several years. Then, he taught in the Christelijke HIS in Narumoda, and with several friends he established the Christelijke HIS for the Batak Christian Protestant Church in Sidikalang. Shortly afterwards, Siregar was called by the government to teach in the state school of Hollands Indische Kweekschool in Tebingtinggi. He taught there for four years until the Japanese came to Sumatra.

== Japanese occupation ==
During the Japanese occupation of the Dutch East Indies, Siregar was asked to teach in the Tyu Gakko, equivalent of Junior High School in Japanese system, but shortly after, he was arrested and was put in custody alongside his Achmad Delui Rangkuti. He was convicted of being a spy and was sentenced to death, but he was freed and soon he taught again in the school.

== Indonesian National Revolution ==
=== Career ===
After the independence of Indonesia, Siregar became the Director of Technical Institute of Pematang Siantar. Alongside his friends, Marnix Hutasoit, Philip Lumbantobing, and AMS Siahaan, Siregar established many schools in Pematang Siantar, such as General High School, Agricultural Institute, Teacher School, Economy Institute, and Technical Institute. The students were also soldiers, making the places as an instrument to develop fighting and intellectual skills.

=== Against the Dutch ===
During the Operation Product and Operation Kraai launched by the Dutch to invade North Sumatra, the North Sumatra branch of Indonesian Christian Party formed the Arrow Division. The division was headed by Siregar as a titular colonel, codenamed Partahuluk Raso (transl. Pandan Hat). Several personnel were originally his student or would become his student. Originally, the HQ of the division was in Pematang Siantar, but later moved to Muara. Together with his friend Bosar Sianipar, code named Mondar Mandir (transl. Loitering), Siregar and him became one of the most wanted figures by the Dutch Army. The division was widely popular in Pematang Siantar due to the divisions' all out defense against the massive Dutch army that managed to broke through the fortifications of Medan Area Lembung.

To eliminate Siregar, the Dutch Army twice bombed the division's HQ. The first one was in Pematang Siantar, which forced him and his division flee to North Tapanuli. The second one was in Lintongnihuta, where the Dutch alleged him to be. In reality, his division was in another place, the Sitio-Tio Cave, not far from Lintongnihuta.

The purpose of the Arrow Division wasn't only to fight against the Dutch. The division also opened trade networks so that logistics for troops can be channeled smoothly. Other than that, the trade network was kept by Siregar as the lifeline for the villagers who rely on farming and agriculture to live. To fulfil the needs, Siregar kept markets nearby opened so that villagers can trade and stockpiled the commodities of the village. In his meantime, he also taught villagers around him. To fulfill the education needs, he recruited his ex-students to be the teacher.

Due to his concurrent position as the head of the Simalungun Volksfront in 1946 and as the head of the Defense Body of East Sumatra and Sumatra, he frequently accompanied the military commander of Indonesia to negotiate with the Dutch Army.

== Political career ==
=== In the Parki ===
Siregar was originally from the Parki party, a party similar to the Indonesian Christian Party that was located in Sumatra. Siregar was one of the founders of the party, and became its second chairman. During his time in Parki, Siregar became the working member of the City Council of Pematang Siantar. Parki officially merged into Parkindo in its congress on Parapat from 10 to 20 April 1947.

== Nomination as National Hero of Indonesia ==
Siregar was nomination as the National Hero of Indonesia at the 100th anniversary of his birth. The nomination was sent to the government on 2013 and 2015 by the committee of the 100th anniversary of his birth. In April 2016, the committee also sent a letter to the president about the title. The document relating to the nomination was processed through the government of Humbang Hasundutan and the government of North Sumatra, and later delivered to the President of Indonesia. The secretary of the committee, Ronald Sihombing, stated that the nomination was based on the accounts of historian, the stories of Siregar's friend, and from scholarly references. The nomination was supported by Try Sutrisno, the 6th Vice President of Indonesia.

== Awards ==
- Independence Freedom Fighters Medal (20 May 1961)
- Star of Mahaputera Adipradana (Second Class) (21 May 1973)
