= All-Indonesian Students' Union =

Alliance of various students' unions in Indonesia

- Badan Eksekutif Mahasiswa Seluruh Indonesia
- Formation: 24 December 2007; 18 years ago
- Type: Alliance of students' unions

The All-Indonesian Students' Union (Indonesian: Badan Eksekutif Mahasiswa Seluruh Indonesia, lit. 'All-Indonesian Students' Executive Body', BEM SI) is an alliance consisting of various member students' unions (or students' representative councils) throughout Indonesia. It was founded on 24 December 2007 at Bogor, West Java. It has recently gained notability for participating in various student-led protests in Indonesia, including 2022 and 2025 protests.

Since 2021, the alliance has been plagued with factionalism, being divided into Rakyat Bangkit and Kerakyatan.

== History ==
The organisation was founded after successfully designing the movement at Bogor from 21 until 24 December 2007, and it initially consisted of more than 30 member students' unions. On 23 March 2008, its representatives met in Lampung and resulted in the creation of Tugu Rakyat ('People's Monument'), which consists of 7 demands, although its contents have been substantially changed since then (but the number remains). On 2 March 2012, the students' union of Gadjah Mada University withdrew from the alliance following 5th national conference at Lampung University.

During the national conference at Andalas University, Padang in April 2021, committee decided to limit the participants into 150 members, in order to uphold the health protocols. As a result, 132 of 168 member students' unions decided to walked out and declared motion of no confidence, viewed that the decision was made unilaterally by committees. The remaining 36 members named themselves Rakyat Bangkit ('Popular Uprising'), while the majority named themselves Kerakyatan ('Peopleness'). Five months later, the Kerakyatan faction attended a national work meeting at Muhammadiyah University of Yogyakarta. This factionalism within BEM SI has led to divergence in political views. According to the coordinator of Kerakyatan faction, Wahyu Suryana, his faction prioritised discussion, scientific analysis, and study.

Several days after 2022 Indonesian student protests, BEM SI rejected the formation of Indonesian Students Party, as they believed students' movements are inherently extra-parliamentary, hence, diminishing the need to establish a political party for students. According to coordinator Kaharuddin, students' movements must be independent from political interests.

Following the conference of Kerakyatan faction on 19 July 2025, students' unions from 10 universities withdrew from their membership. Wiyu Ghaniy Allatif Yudistira, the president of Sultan Agung Islamic University students' union, quoted "the presence of officials and personal interests over discussion of the students' movement".

== Involvements in protests ==
=== 20 October 2023 protests ===
During 20 October 2023 protests at Patung Kuda, Jakarta, BEM SI declared against the creation of the political family of then-president Joko Widodo.

=== February 2025 protests ===
According to central coordinator Herianto, BEM SI called for protests nationwide on 17 and 18 February (cancelled in Jakarta), while they held the protest centrally in Jakarta on 19 and 20 February. They projected that around 5,000 students would participate in the protests.
