= Johannes Leimena =

Indonesian politician, physician, and national hero (1905–1977)

Admiral (Tit.) Dr. Johannes Leimena
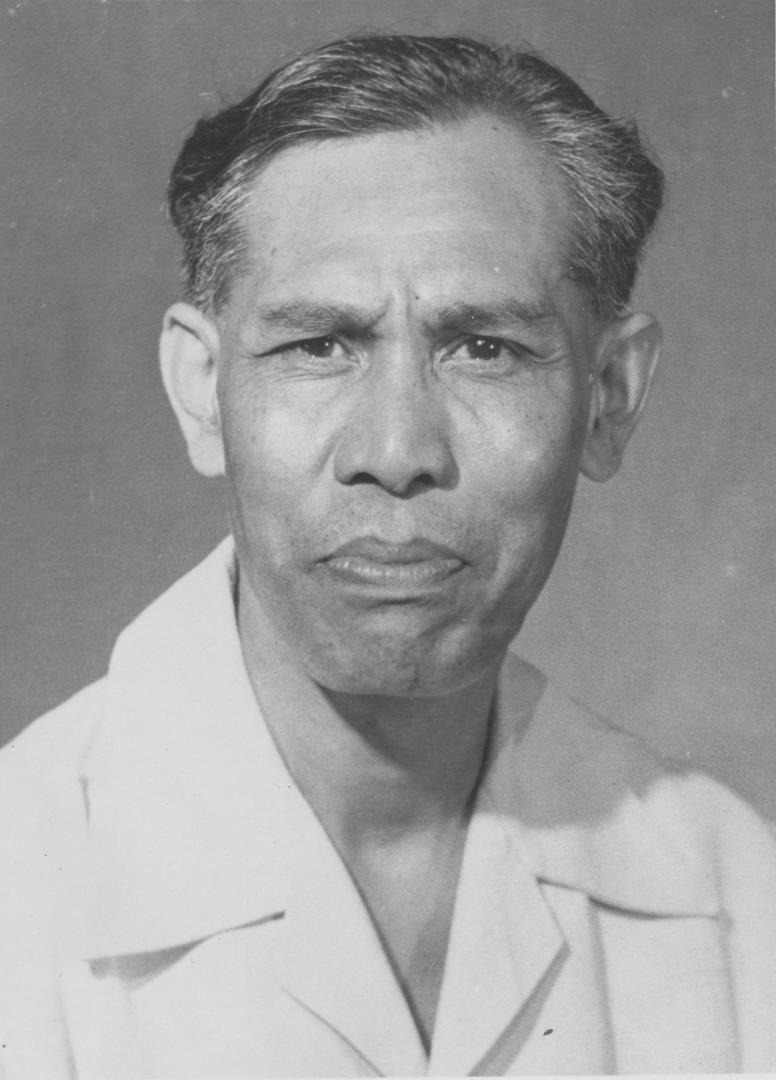
- Portrait, c. 1950s

Deputy Prime Minister of Indonesia
- In office 18 February 1960 – 25 July 1966 Serving with See list
- President: Sukarno
- Preceded by: Djuanda Kartawidjaja
- Succeeded by: Office abolished
- In office 29 April 1957 – 5 July 1959 Serving with Hardi and Idham Chalid
- President: Sukarno
- Preceded by: Idham Chalid
- Succeeded by: Djuanda Kartawidjaja

3rd Chairman of the Indonesian Christian Party
- In office 9 April 1950 – 5 February 1961
- Preceded by: Basuki Probowinoto
- Succeeded by: Albert Mangaratua Tambunan
Ministerial posts
14th Minister of Social Affairs
In office 9 April 1957 – 24 May 1957
Preceded by	Fatah Jasin
Succeeded by	Muljadi Djojomartono
3rd Minister of Health
In office 12 August 1955 – 24 April 1956
Preceded by	Lie Kiat Teng
Succeeded by	Ferdinand Lumban Tobing
In office 3 July 1947 – 30 July 1953
Deputy	Satrio Sastrodiredjo (until 1948)
Preceded by	Darma Setiawan
Succeeded by	Hadrianus Sinaga
1st Coordinating Minister for Distribution
In office 10 July 1959 – 27 March 1966
Preceded by	Office established
Succeeded by	Hartarto Sastrosoenarto
1st Deputy Minister of Health
In office 12 March 1946 – 27 June 1947
Preceded by	Office established
Succeeded by	Satrio Sastrodiredjo
Council posts
Deputy Speaker of the Supreme Advisory Council (Acting)
In office 26 July 1966 – 14 February 1968
Preceded by	Muhammad Ilyas
Succeeded by	M. Sarbini
Member of the Supreme Advisory Council
In office 26 July 1966 – 8 August 1973 Serving with 18 other members
Deputy Speaker of the Constitutional Assembly
In office 9 November 1956 – 5 July 1959 Serving with 4 other members
Preceded by	Office established
Succeeded by	Office disestablished
Member of the People's Representative Council
In office 24 March 1956 – 10 August 1959
Constituency	Maluku

Personal details
- Born: Johannes Leimena; 6 March 1905 Ambon, Maluku, Dutch East Indies
- Died: 29 March 1977 (aged 72) Jakarta, Indonesia
- Resting place: Kalibata Heroes' Cemetery
- Party: Parkindo (Until 1973); PDI (From 1973)
- Spouse: Tjitjih Wiyarsih Leimena (m. 1933)
- Children: 8, including Melani Leimena Suharli
- Parents: Dominggus Leimena (father); Elizabeth Sulilatu (mother)
- Education: STOVIA
- Occupation: Politician; physician
- Nickname: "Om Jo"

Military service
- Allegiance: Indonesia
- Branch/service: Indonesian Navy
- Years of service: 1945–1967
- Rank: Admiral (Titular)
- Battles/wars: Indonesian War of Independence
- Awards: National Hero of Indonesia

Johannes Leimena (often abbreviated as J. Leimena; 6 March 1905 – 29 March 1977), more colloquially referred to as Om Jo, was an Indonesian politician, physician, and national hero. He was one of the longest-serving government ministers in Indonesia, and was the longest-serving under President Sukarno. He filled the roles of Deputy Prime Minister and Minister of Health. An Ambonese Christian, he served in the People's Representative Council and the Constitutional Assembly during the 1950s, and was the chairman of the Indonesian Christian Party from 1951 until 1960.

Leimena was born in Ambon, Maluku, but he grew up in Cimahi and later Batavia (today Jakarta). He became involved in Indonesian nationalist movements through the Ambonese youth group Jong Ambon, and he took part in the two Youth Congresses in 1926 and 1928. In addition, he participated in the Christian ecumenical movement during his time at Batavia's medical school (STOVIA), from which he graduated in 1930. After briefly working in a Batavian hospital, he moved to work at a missionary hospital in Bandung. In 1941, he became a chief physician of hospitals in Purwakarta and Tangerang throughout the Japanese occupation, during which he was briefly arrested and imprisoned.

Following the proclamation of independence and the beginning of the Indonesian National Revolution, Leimena was appointed Deputy Health Minister, and later Health Minister. He retained his ministerial position through nine different cabinets across six years, and was a member of the Indonesian delegations in the Linggadjati, Renville, and Roem–Van Roijen Agreements, as well as the Dutch–Indonesian Round Table Conference. During this time, Leimena founded the Indonesian Christian Party (Parkindo), and was elected the party's chairman in 1950. He also participated in national Christian organizations such as the Communion of Churches in Indonesia. During his tenure as Health Minister, Leimena envisioned a plan to provide preventive healthcare in rural areas, which, despite encountering difficulties during its 1954 implementation, became the precursor of the modern Puskesmas system.

Leimena became Deputy Prime Minister in 1957 and became one of Sukarno's closest aides. During the 30 September Movement and the ensuing political shifts, Leimena was heavily affected, his own house being attacked on the night of the incident. Leimena took part in many meetings to advise Sukarno, with some giving him credit for convincing Sukarno to take a course of action which avoided a civil war. Witnessing the signing of the Supersemar, he lost his position as a government minister after Sukarno's fall. Unlike many of his imprisoned colleagues, Leimena was still involved in politics, becoming a member of the Supreme Advisory Council until 1973. He died in 1977, and his body was interred at the Kalibata Heroes' Cemetery. In 2010, he was declared a National Hero of Indonesia by President Susilo Bambang Yudhoyono.

== Early life and education ==
=== Childhood and family ===
Leimena was born in Ambon, Maluku, on 6 March 1905. His father, Dominggus Leimena, was a substitute teacher in an elementary school in Ambon, and his mother, Elizabeth Sulilatu, also worked as a teacher. Throughout his childhood, Leimena lived in the town of Ambon or at his parents' villages elsewhere on Ambon Island. The Leimena family was descended from the local rajas from his father's home village of Ema, and like the rest of Ema, the Leimena family adhered to Christianity. When Leimena was five years old, his father died and his mother remarried, leaving Leimena to live with his aunt (also an elementary school teacher) while his other siblings moved in with their stepfather. As a child in Ambon, he enrolled in the Dutch language Ambonsche Burgerschool. In 1914, Leimena moved to Cimahi, West Java; his aunt had been promoted to a principal of a school serving the children of Ambonese colonial troops stationed there. After nine months, before Leimena had enrolled at that school, his aunt was reassigned to Batavia.

=== Youth and education ===
In Batavia, he initially enrolled at a Europeesche Lagere School elementary school, but moved to the more diverse Paul Krugerschool after some time. He continued his studies at a Christian-only Meer Uitgebreid Lager Onderwijs. After graduating in 1922, his aunt ruled out enrolling at a Hogere Burgerschool, and Leimena did not qualify for the technical Koningin Wilhelmina School. Leimena applied for jobs as a railway or postal officer, but was rejected by both. Instead, he enrolled at the medical school STOVIA.

During his time at STOVIA, Leimena participated in youth organizations such as the Jong Ambon ("Ambonese Youth") and the Christen Studenten Vereniging ("Christian Students Association"). Leimena became a leading figure within the former, initially advocating neutrality for Jong Ambon in the background of competition between pro-independence and pro-Dutch Ambonese organizations. He also joined the Theosophical Society, influenced by his Sumatran colleagues such as Amir Sjarifuddin and Mohammad Yamin. Leimena's nationalist views deepened in the mid-1920s, as he became aware of Sukarno's founding of the Indonesian National Party and the nationalist aspirations of the Perhimpoenan Indonesia student organization in the Netherlands. In 1926, Leimena was a committee member at the "First Youth Congress", and again in 1928's Second Youth Congress. Outside of the nationalist movements, Leimena also took part in the ecumenical movement, which was taking root in Indonesia during his time at STOVIA. He graduated from STOVIA as a doctor in 1930.

== Medical career ==
After graduating, Leimena first worked at Batavia's Centraal Burgerlijke Ziekenhuis (today Cipto Mangunkusumo Hospital). A year later, he moved to Bandung, where he worked at the Zending Imanuel Hospital until 1941. There, he was promoted to manage the education of new nurses by 1936, and he worked with a number of clinics affiliated with the hospital from the surrounding region. During this time, due to locals' concerns about religious conversions due to treatment in a missionary hospital, Leimena initiated a referral system whereas polyclinics led by mantri (nurses) in villages around Bandung would provide preventive care. Leimena received a medical degree in 1939 from Batavia's Medical College (Geneeskundige Hoogeschool te Batavia), specializing in liver diseases. In 1941, after a decade of working in Bandung, he became chief physician at the Banyu Asin Hospital at Purwakarta. In the aftermath of the Japanese takeover of the Dutch East Indies, the hospital at Purwakarta was briefly occupied by the Japanese before Leimena could return to his work. In 1943, he was arrested and imprisoned by the Japanese military, likely either due to his links with socialist politician Amir Sjarifuddin or his treatment of injured Dutch soldiers after the Battle of Kalijati. He was held for six months and suffered beatings during his incarceration. He was released after he treated a Kenpeitai officer who suffered from malaria.

== Political career ==
=== National Revolution ===
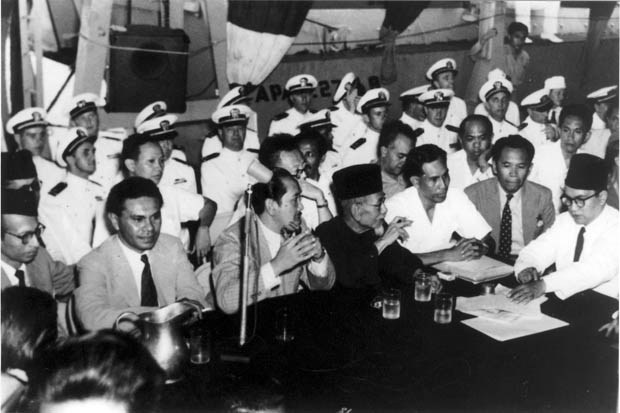
Leimena (third from right) aboard the USS Renville during negotiations with the Dutch

When the Indonesian National Revolution broke out, Leimena had been working at a hospital in Tangerang. In the wake of the Lengkong incident – which saw over 30 Indonesian Army cadets killed – Leimena treated some of the injured, and he met Sukarno when the latter visited the injured cadets at the hospital. Two months after the incident, he accepted an offer to become a Junior Minister for Health in Sutan Sjahrir's second cabinet formed in 1946, under Health Minister Darma Setiawan. According to accounts by his colleagues, Leimena initially rejected the appointment, citing his desire to work as a doctor, but he was convinced by his friend Amir Sjarifuddin, who was by then Minister of Information.

Leimena was first appointed as a full health minister in the First Amir Sjarifuddin Cabinet, which was formed on 3 July 1947. He retained the post until 1953, when the Wilopo Cabinet collapsed, for a total of eight cabinets. He was also a founding member of the Indonesian Christian Party (Parkindo), being appointed as part of the leadership committee upon Parkindo's formation in September 1947. He would later be elected as Parkindo's chairman following the party's 3rd Congress on 6–9 April 1950. Beyond his cabinet position, Leimena agreed to chair the Pemuda Indonesia Maluku (PIM), a pro-Indonesian Ambonese organization formed by Johannes Latuharhary. While both Leimena and Latuharhary were respected, they held little control over PIM's activities.

Leimena was based in Jakarta in the early days of the revolution, but moved alongside the rest of Sjahrir's cabinet in 1946 to Yogyakarta as Jakarta was being increasingly controlled by the Dutch. Leimena was an important member of the Indonesian negotiating team in agreements with the Dutch. He was part of the Indonesian delegation to the Linggadjati Agreement of November 1946, and the Renville Agreement of January 1948 (during which, Leimena remarked, the Indonesian side accepted the Dutch terms under American pressure). After Operation Kraai, Leimena evaded capture and attended talks in Jakarta with representatives from the federal states of the United States of Indonesia in January 1949. During the Roem–Van Roijen Agreement, Leimena also participated in negotiations, and he further participated in the Dutch–Indonesian Round Table Conference in The Hague, leading Indonesia's military delegation.

=== South Maluku Affair ===
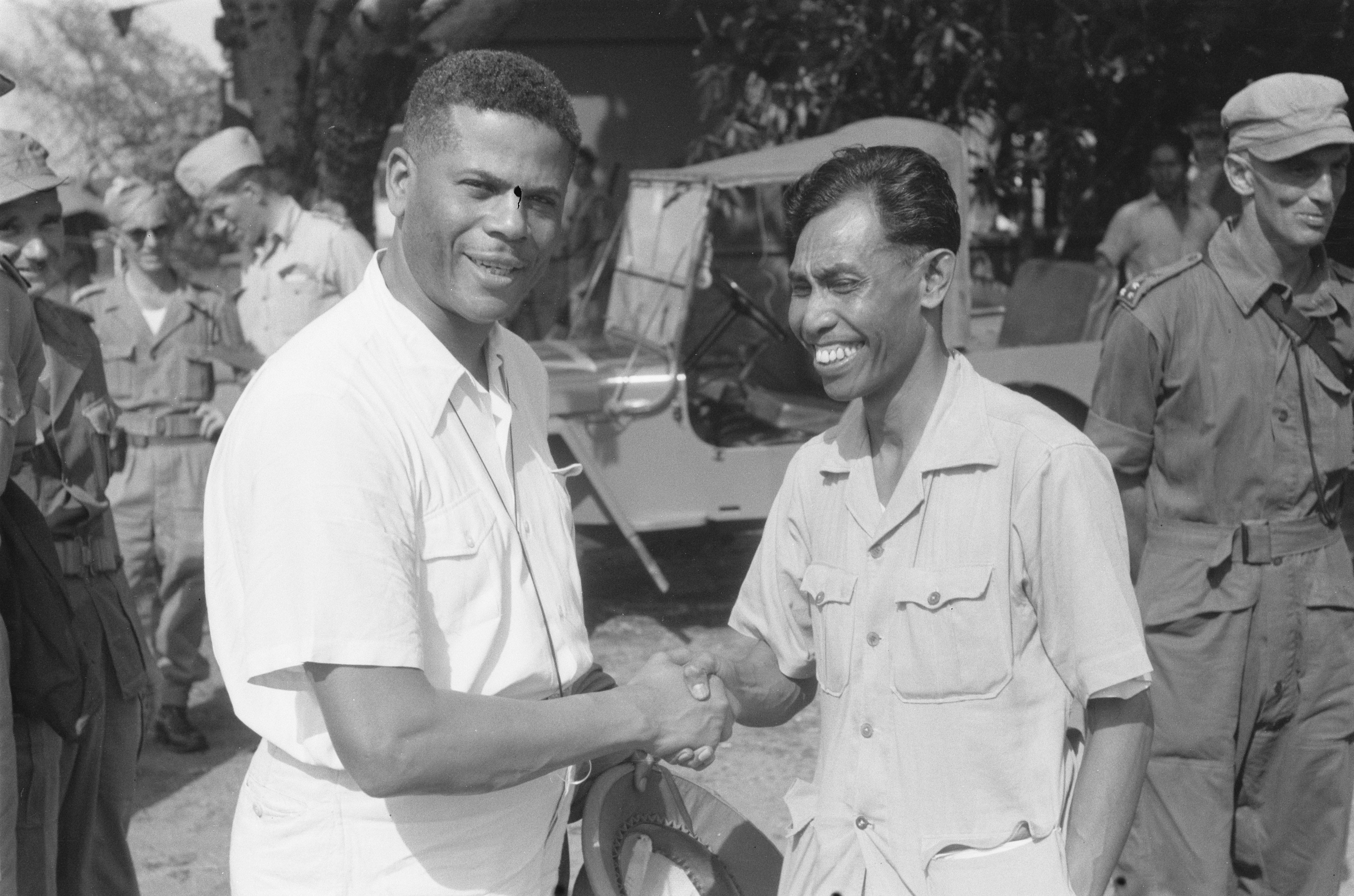
Leimena shaking hands with Hubert Julian, 1949

When the South Maluku Republic (RMS) was declared in Ambon in the aftermath of the Dutch recognition of Indonesian sovereignty, Leimena was dispatched to Ambon to lead the Indonesian government's initial negotiating party ("Leimena mission") with RMS leaders aboard the corvette Hang Tuah. While Leimena attempted to convince RMS leaders in Ambon (where they arrived on 1 May 1950) and Saparua to come aboard Hang Tuah to negotiate, the leaders refused, wanting to negotiate on board neutral vessels while under United Nations supervision. Additionally, the RMS leaders wanted to be recognized as representatives of an independent state, a request that was refused.

Leimena had initially intended to travel to Ambon aboard a KNIL aircraft, but this was overridden by the Defense Minister at that time. After further attempts at negotiation failed, tensions continued to rise between the Indonesian government and RMS, with another attempt in June endorsed by Leimena failing due to difficulty in securing transport. A last-ditch effort at establishing contact was attempted by sending Leimena to Namlea on 27 September, reportedly giving him wide authority in the negotiations including amnesty and autonomy for the region, but the mission was interrupted by TNI's landings in Ambon the day after Leimena's departure.

=== Post-war health minister ===
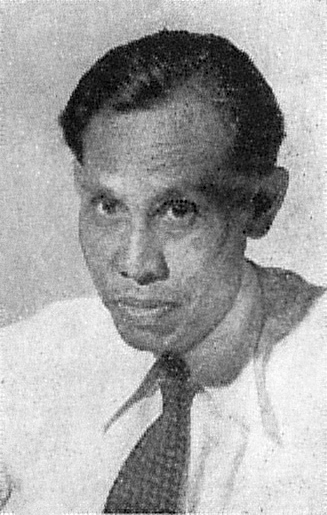
Portrait of Leimena in 1954

Due to underinvestment in public health during the Dutch colonial period, military takeover of health infrastructure during the Japanese occupation, general malnutrition, and disruptions by the military actions during the Revolution, the Indonesian public health sector in 1949 had failed to become what had been envisioned by nationalist leaders. Leimena viewed public health as a necessity in the reconstruction of Indonesia and in socioeconomic development, and during his time as health minister he put significant efforts into preventive healthcare and hygiene in rural Indonesia. This was directly in contrast to the pre-independence Dutch health policy, which focused on healthcare in urban areas. In 1950, the municipal government of Bandung initiated a project based on missionary hospital networks, under which an urban central hospital would be supported by a number of smaller clinics in surrounding villages. The hospital and the clinics would be run under a singular system, directed by a head physician at the regency (subprovincial) level.

This program, dubbed the "Bandung Plan", received strong support from Leimena, and was strongly inspired by Leimena's experience at the Imanuel Hospital. The Bandung Plan (or its later name, the "Leimena Plan") was initially slated to be launched across Indonesia in 1954, but encountered administrative bottlenecks and financial constraints. Another important factor complicating the implementation was a lack of doctors; European doctors were leaving Indonesia and many local doctors were leaving their practices for revolutionary careers in the military or politics. Despite these issues, the Bandung Plan became the basis of the Puskesmas system established in the late 1960s. Three laws related to healthcare, presented to the government by Leimena's ministry, were passed in June 1951. These laws required new doctors and dentists to work for the government for three years before being allowed to open a practice, permitted the government to ban new private practices in certain areas (aimed at urban centers), and authorized the government to requisition private doctor services during times of crisis.

Leimena in 1952 also announced that medical practice was designated specifically for qualified doctors, hence excluding auxiliary medical personnel from opening their own practices. He also formed the Public Food Board (Lembaga Makanan Rakyat), which advised the general public on nutrition. Under a fellowship from the World Health Organization, Leimena travelled to Europe in 1953, where he observed the healthcare systems of Norway, the United Kingdom (NHS), and Yugoslavia. He also went to Egypt, India and Singapore, where he also attended lectures and discussions in addition to observing existing health services. The Norwegian health system, which envisioned raising the standards of living through the improvement of nutrition and working conditions, left an impression on Leimena. Leimena had concerns regarding foreign aid being used to influence Indonesian foreign policy and politics through terms and conditions, and called for unconditional aid for health services from developed countries. Leimena's first tenure as health minister came to an end on 30 July 1953, though he served another few months as Health Minister under the Burhanuddin Harahap Cabinet.

During the last months of the Harahap cabinet, Leimena was dispatched to Geneva to negotiate regarding the West New Guinea dispute. While the delegation managed to secure Dutch recognition of the dissolution of the Netherlands-Indonesian Union, and gained some concessions on bilateral financial and economic agreements, domestic political pressure resulted in most of the delegation being called home. Leimena, who stayed in Geneva, apparently intended to resign and reportedly said that he felt like "a fisherman who has caught something and is told to throw it back into the water". After the Harahap Cabinet's collapse, Ali Sastroamidjojo intentionally excluded all ministers who served the entire length of the Harahap cabinet, including Leimena, from his cabinet. At that time, Leimena had also been elected as a member of the People's Representative Council representing Maluku in the 1955 elections. He was then appointed into the Constitutional Assembly of Indonesia, as a deputy speaker, until he became inactive due to further appointment as minister. Aside from his work as health minister, Leimena also participated in the newly formed Communion of Churches in Indonesia (Dewan Gereja Indonesia or DGI, later PGI). He was elected its deputy chairman in 1950, and he remained in that position until 1964, when he instead became an honorary chairman until his death. He also founded the Indonesian Christian Student Movement (GMKI) in February 1950, which was a merger of the pro-Dutch Christen Studenten Vereniging and the Indonesian Christian Student Union. Leimena became the movement's inaugural chairman from its founding until its first congress in December 1950.

=== Guided Democracy period ===
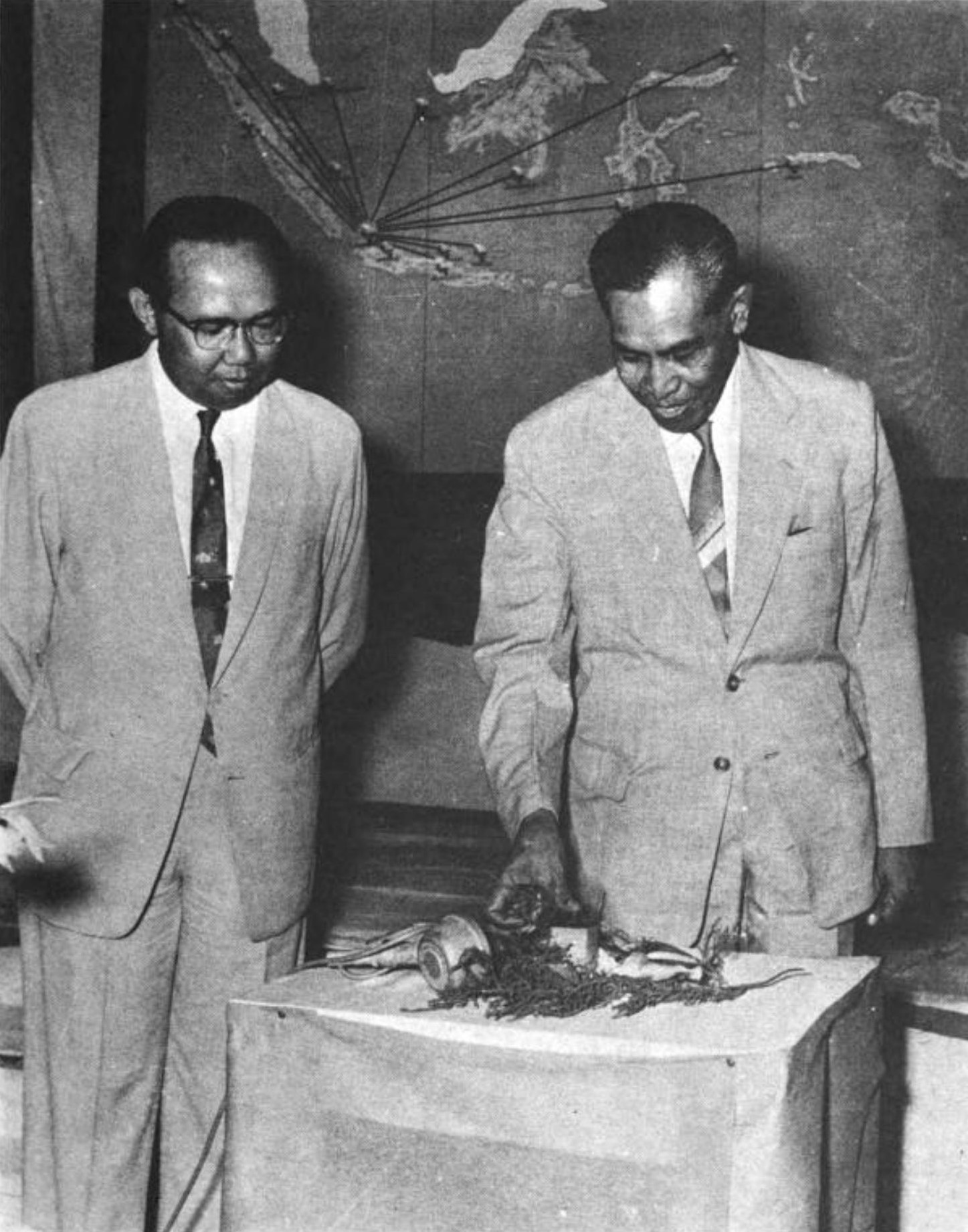
Leimena (right) with Sahala Hamonangan Simatupang in a ceremony launching telex in Indonesia, 1961

After the collapse of the Second Ali Sastroamidjojo Cabinet in 1957, Leimena took a position where he stated that further collapses of cabinets could only be prevented by a more inclusive government, including political parties and groups previously excluded. Within the Djuanda Cabinet, which started on 9 April 1957, Leimena was initially appointed as Social Minister, but by that year as well he was relieved from that post and instead became a Deputy Prime Minister. Leimena joined the "National Council" which was formed in May 1957, and late in 1957, Leimena was also appointed into a "Committee of Seven" intended to manage undergoing issues with the Indonesian Army. Other members of the committee were Sukarno, Mohammad Hatta, Djuanda Kartawidjaja, Abdul Haris Nasution, Hamengkubuwono IX, and Azis Saleh. Leimena was a loyalist of Sukarno, including after Sukarno's 1959 Decree. From 1957 to 1959, he largely passed over the work of being Parkindo chairman to A.M. Tambunan.

After the 1959 Decree, Leimena was appointed Distribution Minister, and shortly afterwards also became Deputy First Minister. Within his capacity as Distribution Minister, he saw nutritional intake as vital in improving worker productivity and desired to achieve rice self-sufficiency for the growing population through intensification of rice cultivation in Java while expanding farmlands elsewhere. However, his plans stalled due to issues regarding coordination with the Ministries of Agriculture, Transmigration and Labor.

Leimena was part of the Supreme Operations Command (Komando Operasi Tertinggi/KOTI) in 1962 during the West New Guinea dispute. He was given a titular rank of a vice admiral of the Indonesian Navy in 1962, and was promoted to admiral on 17 August 1964. In November 1963, following the unexpected death of Djuanda, a presidium was appointed by Sukarno to manage the cabinet, consisting of Leimena, Subandrio, and Chaerul Saleh. During the whole of the Guided Democracy period, Leimena remained a close ally of Sukarno, being skilled with handling the political elite, though he lacked the ability to organize large-scale popular support. Due to his position as Deputy First Minister, he took over presidential duties as acting president seven times.

=== 1965 coup and Supersemar ===
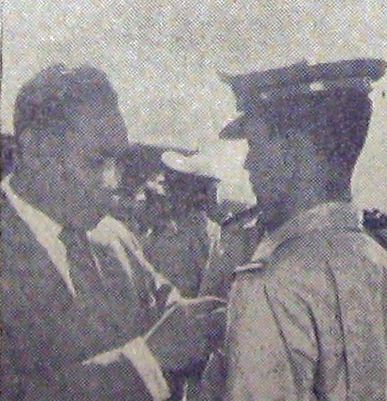
Leimena as Deputy First Minister giving an airman his wings

Let me die here, I will not run away, for if they entered this door... let me die, because my son, Karel Satsuit Tubun has died on his duty to guard me.

— Leimena to his wife after hearing of Tubun's death, 1 October 1965

At the time of the 30 September Movement, Leimena's house was located two houses down and across the street from Army General Abdul Haris Nasution, who was a key target for the coup organizers. Around one hundred men were involved in the early morning operations against Nasution's house, and as Leimena had three men assigned to him as personal bodyguards due to his position, the rebel soldiers wanted to prevent them from interfering in the kidnapping of Nasution. In the ensuing scuffle, one of Leimena's guards, Karel Satsuit Tubun, was killed, but no further attempts were made by rebels to enter his residence or to take Leimena into custody. Leimena, upon learning that Tubun had been killed, refused to flee the house. The incident at Leimena's home received more attention than some of the attacks on the generals' homes, and it was assumed then that Leimena was a target for the rebels, though he was not. Initial reports of the attack which Suharto received from Umar Wirahadikusumah erroneously reported that Leimena had been captured along with the generals.

In the immediate aftermath of the incident, still on the morning of 1 October, Leimena was summoned by Sukarno to Halim Perdanakusuma airforce Airbase, where he had gone to speak with the coup leaders. Leimena first consulted with Suharto before heading to Halim, and he delivered a message from Suharto to Sukarno requesting the latter leave Halim before 16:30 that day, as that was the time limit Suharto gave the coup forces to surrender before he would launch an attack on Halim. Leimena remained with Sukarno all afternoon in Halim. After discussions there resulted in the appointment of Pranoto Reksosamudro as acting Army Chief of Staff to replace the late Ahmad Yani, they were informed that Kostrad (Army Strategic Command) under Suharto was preparing the attack on the airbase. Apparently, while Sukarno was nearly convinced to head east for Madiun, East Java or Bali as suggested by coup leaders such as Omar Dani, Leimena convinced Sukarno not to do so, fearing an imminent civil war. In following Leimena's advice, Sukarno had foiled the coup's primary objective of getting Sukarno to a place where he would be under the coup's control. The Bogor Palace was a "neutral" area, so heading to Bogor according to Sukarno's weekly routine would disassociate Sukarno from the coup. Leimena was named by the coup plotters as part of an "Indonesian Revolution Council" (nearly half of which was sitting government officials) on the afternoon of 1 October.

On 3 March 1966, as acting minister for higher education and science, Leimena ordered the closure of the University of Indonesia, but his order was ignored by the army units guarding the university. Leimena was present during a cabinet meeting on 11 March in Jakarta during which troops took up positions in front of the palace. Later in the afternoon, Leimena joined Sukarno and two other Deputy Prime Ministers (Subandrio and Chaerul Saleh) in meeting with Army generals Amirmachmud, Mohammad Jusuf and Basuki Rahmat at the Bogor Palace. The outcome of that meeting was the Supersemar, which handed over considerable powers to Suharto. Leimena attended another meeting on 16 March during which Sukarno refused demands to reorganize his cabinet. Regardless, on 18 March, fifteen cabinet ministers were dismissed and arrested, but Leimena alone initially retained his position in a newly formed five-member cabinet presidium (himself, Hamengkubuwono IX, Idham Chalid, Adam Malik and Ruslan Abdulgani). He had, at that time, served as government minister for nearly twenty years in a similar number of cabinets.

=== New Order ===
During the New Order, Suharto reportedly intended to retain Leimena as a minister, but the latter politely refused the position by going through Hamengkubuwono IX. Instead, he was appointed as the acting deputy speaker of the Supreme Advisory Council (DPA) from 1966 until 1968. After his acting deputy speaker term had expired, he remained a member of the council until 1973. During his time in the council, he resolved several internal disputes of the DPA, on topics such as tax inequality, nationwide education, and the question of who should become acting president when the president was abroad. He was also appointed as the director of the Cikini Hospital on 11 December 1968. Leimena was one of the few politicians in this period who did not distance himself from Sukarno.

Leimena was elected into the People's Representative Council following the 1971 election, but he did not take office. After the fusion of the Indonesian Christian Party to the Indonesian Democratic Party in 1973, Leimena was appointed as the deputy chairman of the party's advisory council.

== Views ==
Prior to Indonesia's independence, Leimena had been speaking about the differences between the international Christian movement and the nationalist Indonesian independence movement. Sukarno described him as having "a dominee soul, but against the colonialism-imperialism he never ceased to combat and to strive". After independence, Leimena wrote against the Darul Islam movement, and also opposed separatism and communism. This opposition to both positions partly led to Leimena's strong affinity toward Sukarno, who leaned toward a Pancasila-based state. Despite this view, Leimena found much common ground with some of the more socialist-leaning Islamic Masyumi leaders such as Mohammad Natsir and Sjafruddin Prawiranegara.

Leimena gave two addresses to meetings of the DGI in 1950 and 1964, where he promoted the idea where the interests and aims of the church are parallel with that of the country. He had written a piece for the Christian magazine Eltheto during his time in the Netherlands, in which he mentioned that "the duty of an Indonesian Christian is to show how Christianity has nothing to do with colonialism".

== Personal life and family ==
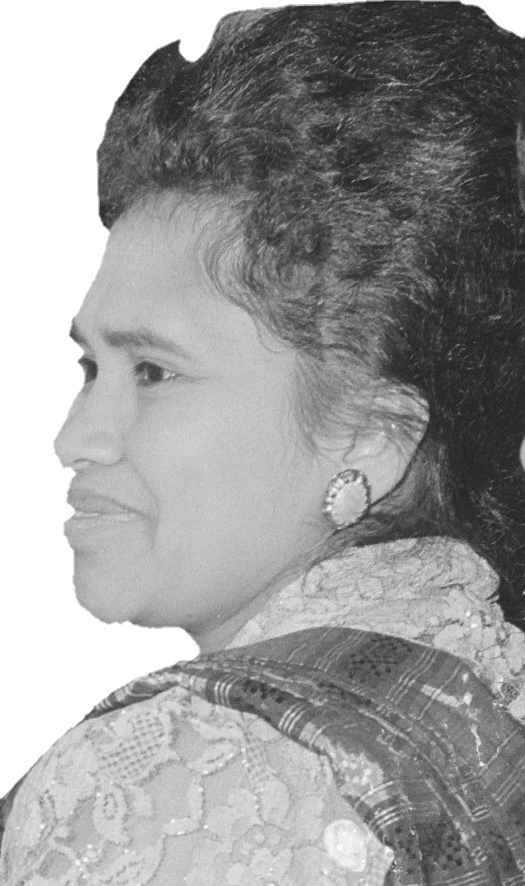
Leimena's wife, Wijarsih Prawiradilaga

During his time at STOVIA, Leimena was a football player on the school's team and several locally famous teams. Leimena married his wife, Wijarsih Prawiradilaga, an ethnic Javanese Muslim woman, during his time working as a doctor in Bandung. The couple had four sons and four daughters. One of his daughters, Melani Leimena Suharli, would serve as a deputy speaker of the People's Consultative Assembly.

His family noted Leimena's tendency to dress in simple clothing, especially white-colored attire. In his autobiography, Sukarno noted how Leimena, while on diplomatic missions during the Indonesian Revolution, lacked formal clothes and had to borrow sets of a suit and tie from colleagues.

== Death ==
Leimena died in Jakarta on 29 March 1977, at around 07:30 a.m. He had been suffering from an illness during a recent trip to Europe, when he was forced to return to Indonesia on a wheelchair. After his funeral service, he received a military funeral at Kalibata Heroes' Cemetery.

== Honours ==
=== National ===
- Indonesia:
  - Star of the Republic of Indonesia, 2nd Class (1973)
  - Guerrilla Star (1959)
  - Development Medal (1961)
  - Independence Medal
  - Civil Service Long Service Medals, 1st Class

=== Foreign ===
- Philippines: Commander of the Order of Sikatuna
- Bolivia: Grand Cross of the Order of the Condor of the Andes
- Romania: Order of 23 August, 2nd Class
- Yugoslavia: Order of the Yugoslav Flag, 1st Class
- Ecuador: Grand Cross of the National Order of Merit

== Legacy ==
Sukarno and Mohammad Roem said that Leimena was an honest politician and a skilled diplomat. Sutan Sjahrir described Leimena's relationship with Sukarno as "telling what he felt sincerely to Sukarno, but he wouldn't leave Sukarno by all by himself". Many of his colleagues saw him as a senior figure, hence his nickname "Om Jo" (i.e. "Uncle Jo"), in contrast to many contemporary figures referred to with the more egalitarian "Bung".

In 2010, 33 years after his death, Leimena was awarded the title of National Hero of Indonesia by President Susilo Bambang Yudhoyono. A public hospital in Ambon, RSUP Dr Johannes Leimena, was named after him in 2019. A statue of Leimena, inaugurated in 2012, is also present in Ambon next to Pattimura University. The Leimena Institute, operated by the DGI, had been established in 2004, having been founded as the Leimena Academy in 1984 as a think tank.

== Writings ==
- The Dutch-Indonesian Conflict (1949)
- Public Health in Indonesia: Problems and Planning (1955)
