= 1st Congress of the National Christian Party =

6 December 1945 – 8 December 1945	2nd →
- Host country: Indonesia
- Cities: Surakarta

The First Congress of the National Christian Party (Indonesian: Kongres I Partai Kristen Nasional) was held between 6–8 December 1945. (Note: Official reports stated the congress was from 6–7 December 1945.) The congress was the first congress of the party, held in one month after the formation on November 10, 1945. The congress was only attended by the party delegates from Java.

The congress decided to change the name of the party from National Christian Party to Indonesian Christian Party. A permanent central executive committee of the party was formed.

== Background ==
Prior to the congress, the National Christian Party was established in a meeting of Christian figures on 10 November 1945. The party was intended to accommodate the political views of both Catholics and Protestants in Indonesia, but the Catholic delegation seceded from the party, and formed the Catholic Party on 12 December 1945. The meeting also choose the temporary executive committee of the party, with Wilhelmus Zakaria Johannes as the chairman and Maryoto as the secretary.

== Congress ==
The congress was opened on 5.00 with a praying ceremony at the Margoyudan Church, led by Ds. Reksohatmodjo. After the opening ceremony, party delegates from different regions of Java begin to attended the congress until 12.00. The delegates were lodged at the Indonesian Christian Party Hall in Kartisono Street.
