= Satya Wacana Christian University =

Christian university in Indonesia

Satya Wacana Christian University (SWCU)
- Universitas Kristen Satya Wacana (UKSW)
- Former names: Indonesian Christian College for Teacher Education
- Motto: Indonesian: Menyegani Tuhan adalah pangkal pengetahuan
- Motto in English: Reverence for The Eternal is the first thing in knowledge
- Type: Private University
- Established: 1956; 70 years ago
- Founders: Rev. B. Probowinoto, Rev. Tan Ik Hay, S.M.A. Pasariboe, Jac van der Waals
- Affiliations: Association of Christian Universities and Colleges in Asia, Wira Wacana Christian University, Bina Darma Foundation
- Religious affiliation: Protestant
- Rector: Prof. Dr. Intiyas Utami, S.E., M.Si., Ak
- First Rector: Dr. (HC) O. Notohamidjojo, S.H.
- Academic staff: 490
- Students: ±15,156 (fall 2019)
- Location: Salatiga, Central Java, Indonesia; 7.31975°S 110.498583°E
- Chairman of Senate: Prof. Daniel D. Kameo, Ph.D.
- Colors: Gold
- Website: www.uksw.edu

Satya Wacana Christian University (Indonesian: Universitas Kristen Satya Wacana), abbreviated as UKSW, is a private university located in Salatiga, Central Java, Indonesia. The name itself is derived from Sanskrit, meaning "Faithful to the Word / Word of God". UKSW's campuses are spread all-around Salatiga.

== History ==
SWCU was established as the College for Christian Teachers (PTPGKI) on November 30, 1956, by 9 Indonesian church synods. At the time of inception there were 5 studies: Teaching & Education, History, English, Law, and Economics. On July 17, 1959 PTPGKI changed to Christian Faculty of Teaching and Education Indonesia (FKIP-KI) and on December 5, 1959 FKIP-KI was christened as Satya Wacana Christian University.

== Programs offered ==
The university has of 14 faculties providing 4 diplomas courses, 39 undergraduate courses, 10 graduate courses and 3 postgraduate courses. Some graduate and postgraduate courses are managed by the separate postgraduate program.

No.	Faculty	Department	Grade (Degree)
1	Faculty of Agriculture and Business	Agrotechnology	Bachelor
1	Faculty of Agriculture and Business	Agribusiness	Bachelor
1	Faculty of Agriculture and Business	Agriculture Science	Master
2	Faculty of Biology	Biology	Bachelor
2	Faculty of Biology	Biology Education	Bachelor
2	Faculty of Biology	Biology	Master
3	Faculty of Economics and Business	Secretary	3-year Associate Program
3	Faculty of Economics and Business	Management	Bachelor
3	Faculty of Economics and Business	Economics Sciences	Bachelor
3	Faculty of Economics and Business	Accounting	Bachelor
3	Faculty of Economics and Business	Management	Master
3	Faculty of Economics and Business	Accounting	Master
3	Faculty of Economics and Business	Management	Doctorate
4	Faculty of Electronics and Computer Engineering	Computer engineering	Bachelor
4	Faculty of Electronics and Computer Engineering	Electronics engineering	Bachelor
5	Faculty of Information Technology	Accounting information system	3-year Associate Program
5	Faculty of Information Technology	Information technology	3-year Associate Program
5	Faculty of Information Technology	Computer education	Bachelor
5	Faculty of Information Technology	Library science	Bachelor
5	Faculty of Information Technology	Public relations	Bachelor
5	Faculty of Information Technology	Information technology	Bachelor
5	Faculty of Information Technology	Information system	Bachelor
5	Faculty of Information Technology	Visual communication design	Bachelor
5	Faculty of Information Technology	Information system	Master
6	Faculty of Health Science	Nursing education	Bachelor
6	Faculty of Health Science	Nutrition Education	Bachelor
6	Faculty of Health Science	Physical education, health and recreation	Bachelor
6	Faculty of Health Science	Food Technology	Bachelor
7	Faculty of Law	Law	Bachelor
7	Faculty of Law	Law	Master
8	Faculty of Language and Arts	English language education	Bachelor
8	Faculty of Language and Arts	English language education	Master
8	Faculty of Language and Arts	English literature	Bachelor
8	Faculty of Language and Arts	Music	Bachelor
9	Faculty of Psychology	Psychology	Bachelor
9	Faculty of Psychology	Psychological Science	Master
10	Faculty of Science and Mathematics	Chemistry	Bachelor
10	Faculty of Science and Mathematics	Math	Bachelor
10	Faculty of Science and Mathematics	Physics	Bachelor
10	Faculty of Science and Mathematics	Physics education	Bachelor
11	Faculty of Social and Communication Studies	Communication Education	Bachelor
11	Faculty of Social and Communication Studies	International relations	Bachelor
11	Faculty of Social and Communication Studies	Sociology	Bachelor
12	Faculty of Teaching and Education	Guidance and Counseling	Bachelor
12	Faculty of Teaching and Education	Pancasila and Civic education	Bachelor
12	Faculty of Teaching and Education	History	Bachelor
12	Faculty of Teaching and Education	Economics education	Bachelor
12	Faculty of Teaching and Education	Math	Bachelor
12	Faculty of Teaching and Education	Primary education	Bachelor
12	Faculty of Teaching and Education	Primary education	Master
12	Faculty of Teaching and Education	Early childhood education	Bachelor
12	Faculty of Teaching and Education	Educational Administration	Master
13	Faculty of Theology	Theological Sciences	Bachelor
13	Faculty of Theology	Sociology of religion	Master
13	Faculty of Theology	Sociology of religion	Doctorate
14	Faculty of Interdisciplinary Studies	Tourist attraction	4-year Associate Program
14	Faculty of Interdisciplinary Studies	Development Studies	Master
14	Faculty of Interdisciplinary Studies	Development Studies	Doctorate

== Collaboration ==
SWCU collaborates with the following foreign tertiary educational institutions:

- Universidade Da Paz
- Mennonite Central Committee
- University of Glasgow
- Evangelical Lutheran Church in America
- Kwansei Gakuin University
- Valparaiso University
- Christian University of Thailand
- East Timor Democratic Republic
- Chang Jung Christian University
- World Links Education Pty Ltd
- Omron
- Arizona State University
- Beloit College
- Luther Seminary
- St. Olaf College
- Griffith University
- Southern Cross University
- University of Western Sydney
- Charles Darwin University
- Seagate Technology
- Mennonite Church in the Netherlands
- Christelijke Hogesschol-Leeuwarden
- Educate Facultiet Amsterdam (Amsterdam Faculty of Education)
- Presbyterian Church in Ireland
- Passau University
- Vrije Universiteit Amsterdam
- Ateneo de Manila University
- Chung Yuan Christian University
- Hyugo University Mobility in Asia Pacific
- The Presbyterian Church of Korea
- Australian National University
- World Links Education Pty Ltd
- Queensland University of Technology
- Evangelical Lutheran Church in Indonesia
- National University of East Timor
