= Wilhelmus Zakaria Johannes =

Indonesian doctor (1895–1952)

Dr. Wilhelmus Zakaria Johannes
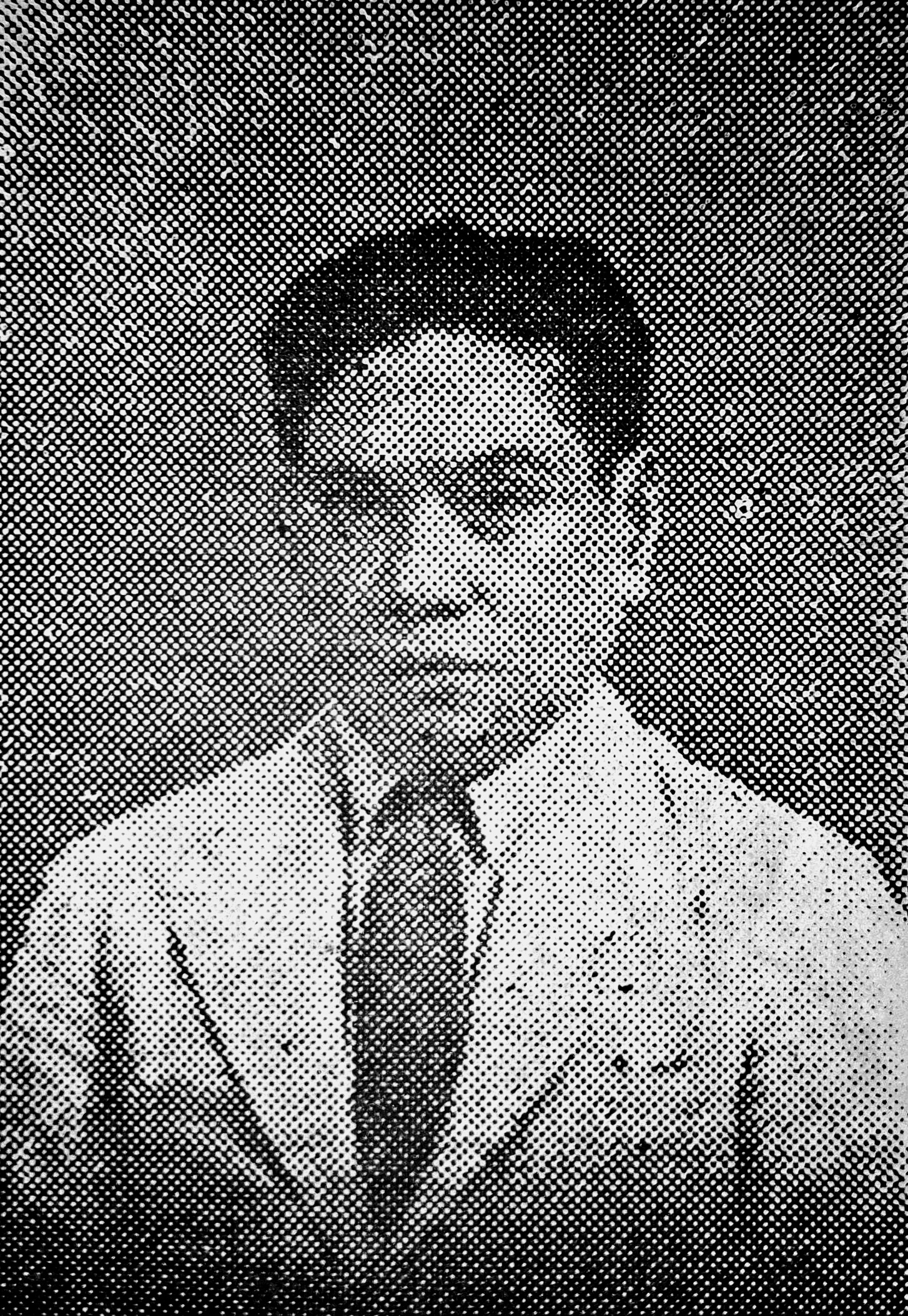

Personal details
- Born: Wilhelmus Zakaria Johannes; 1895 Rote, East Nusa Tenggara, Dutch East Indies (Netherlands)
- Died: 4 September 1952 (aged 56–57) The Hague, Netherlands
- Occupation: Doctor; radiologist

Wilhelmus Zakaria Johannes (1895 – 4 September 1952) was an Indonesian radiology medical doctor. Johannes was the first Indonesian medical doctor who learned radiology in the CBZ (Civil Hospital) in Batavia and then became an expert in Rontgen technology and had contributed a lot to the development of medical studies in Indonesia. The Indonesian government honored WZ Johannes as a National Hero of Indonesia and named a general hospital in Kupang, East Nusa Tenggara after him. As a tribute, the name Wilhelmus Zakaria Johannes was used on an Indonesian Navy ship, the KRI Wilhelmus Zakarias Yohannes. Johannes died in 1952 and was buried at the Jati Petamburan Cemetery in Central Jakarta.

WZ Johannes was the cousin of Professor Herman Johannes, an Indonesian professor who was the Rector of Gadjah Mada University and uncle of Helmi Johannes, a newscaster and executive producer for VOA Indonesian television in Washington DC.
