= Indonesian Christian Party =

Defunct political party in Indonesia

Indonesian Christian Party Partai Kristen Indonesia
- Abbreviation: Parkindo
- Chairman: Wilhelmus Zakaria Johannes (first); Melanchton Siregar (last)
- Secretary-General: Maryoto (first); Sabam Sirait (last)
- Founded: 10 November 1945
- Dissolved: 11 January 1973
- Preceded by: Parki
- Merged into: Indonesian Democratic Party
- Succeeded by: Indonesian Christian Party 1945; Prosperous Peace Party (claimed)
- Headquarters: Djakarta
- Newspaper: Kemudi; Sinar Harapan
- Think tank: Association of Indonesian Christian Intelligence
- Student wing: Indonesian Christian Student Movement; Indonesian Christian Pupil Movement
- Youth wing: Indonesian Christian Youth Movement
- Women's wing: Indonesian Christian Women's Association
- Armed wing: Arrow Division (during Indonesian National Revolution)
- Membership: 1,049,475 (1969)
- Ideology: Pancasila; Christian democracy
- Political position: Centre-right
- Religion: Protestant

The Indonesian Christian Party (Indonesian: Partai Kristen Indonesia), better known as Parkindo, was a Christian political party active in Indonesia from 1950 until 1973, when it was merged to make the Indonesian Democratic Party.

Founded by Johannes Leimena and Melanchton Siregar, the former Military Governor of North Sumatra, who was known as a local teacher in Tarutung. Its support was concentrated in Protestant areas of Indonesia. It had considerable influence despite the small number of Christians in Indonesia due to the large numbers of Christians in the civil service, the army and educational establishments and because of the high profile of party leader Johannes Leimena who served in several Indonesian cabinets and as deputy prime minister. In the 1955 Indonesian legislative election, the party won 2.6% of the vote and eight seats in the People's Representative Council. However, in the 1971 elections, the last it contested before being merged into the Indonesian Democratic Party, it gained only 1.34% of the vote.

== History ==
=== Pre-independence ===
The first Christian party in the Dutch East Indies was the Christelijk Ethische Partij (transl. Christian Ethic Party), which was established on 25 September 1917. According to the constitution of the party, the party strives to make the statutes of God, as revealed in the Holy Scriptures, nature and history, the foundation of the political life in the Dutch East Indies. At the formation of the party, it had around 800 members. The party also invited native Indonesians, which was a rarity for Dutch-majority party at that time. The party changed its name to Christenlijk Staatkundige Partij (transl. Christian Constitutional Party) on 1929. The party gained five seats in the 1935 Dutch East Indies Volksraad election, on which three seats to the native Indonesians, and two seats to Europeans.

=== Establishment ===
The party was established following the decree by the government on 3 November 1945 to form "as many political parties as possible" in Indonesia. The decree was an attempt by the government to eradicate rumors that stated that Sukarno and Hatta would make Indonesia a one-party state, governed by the Indonesian National Party. Six days after the decree, Christian politicians of Indonesia held a meeting to discuss the possibility of establishing a party for Christians. The meeting was held in the Pasundan Church. The Protestants sent Basuki Probowinoto, Todung Sutan Gunung Mulia, Fredrick Laoh, Wilhelmus Zakaria Johannes, J. K. Panggabean, Soedarsono, Maryoto and Martinus Abednego, while the Catholics sent Suradi and Hadi. After the delegates agreed to form a political party, the Catholic delegates withdrew from the meeting, giving the reason that they had to talk about it first with the leaders of the Catholic Church.

The meeting finally produced an agreement to form a party for Christians under the name National Christian Party (Indonesian: Partai Kristen Nasional). The name was proposed by Todung Sutan Gunung Mulia. The delegates chose Wilhelmus Zakaria Johannes as the chairman and Maryoto as the general secretary by acclamation. On 10 November 1945, the delegates declared the formation of the National Christian Party.

== Notable members ==
=== National Heroes of Indonesia ===
- Wilhelmus Zakaria Johannes, first chairman of the party
- Johannes Leimena, third chairman of the party
- Ir. Martinus Putuhena
- Izaak Huru Doko, nominated as the MP of the party from East Nusa Tenggara
- Silas Papare

=== Ministers ===
- Johannes Leimena, seated seven different ministerial positions from 1946 until 1966
- Ir. Martinus Putuhena, Prime Minister of East Indonesia (1950) and Minister of Public Works (1945–1947)
- Todung Sutan Gunung Mulia, Minister of Education (1945–1946)
- Albert Mangaratua Tambunan, Minister of Social Affairs (1966–1970)
- Wilhelm Johannis Rumambi, Liaison Minister (1959–1966), Minister of Information (1966)

== Chairmen ==
#	Portrait	Name (Birth – Death)	Term of office		
#	Portrait	Name (Birth – Death)	Took office	Left office	Time in office
1		Wilhelmus Zakaria; Johannes (1895 – 1952)	9 November 1945	7 December 1945	28 days
2		Basuki Probowinoto (1917 – 1989)	7 December 1945	9 April 1950	4 years, 123 days
3		Johannes Leimena (1905 – 1977)	9 April 1950	5 February 1961	10 years, 298 days
4		A. M. Tambunan (1910 – 1970)	5 February 1961	22 October 1967	6 years, 263 days
5		Melanchton Siregar (1912 – 1975)	22 October 1967	11 January 1973	5 years, 81 days

== Election results ==
=== People's Representative Council ===
Election	Party leader	Seats	Seat change	Votes	% of votes	Outcome of election
1955	Johannes Leimena	8 / 257		1,003,325	2.6%	Governing coalition
1971	Melanchton Siregar	7 / 360	▼1	733,359	1.34%	Governing coalition

=== Constitutional Assembly ===
Election	Party leader	Seats	Votes	% of votes	Bloc
1955	Johannes Leimena	16 / 514	988,810	2.61%	Pancasila Bloc
