= Liberal democracy period in Indonesia =

Parliamentary democracy era

Indonesian Liberal Democracy Era
- 17 August 1950 – 5 July 1959
Indonesian National Revolution	Guided Democracy
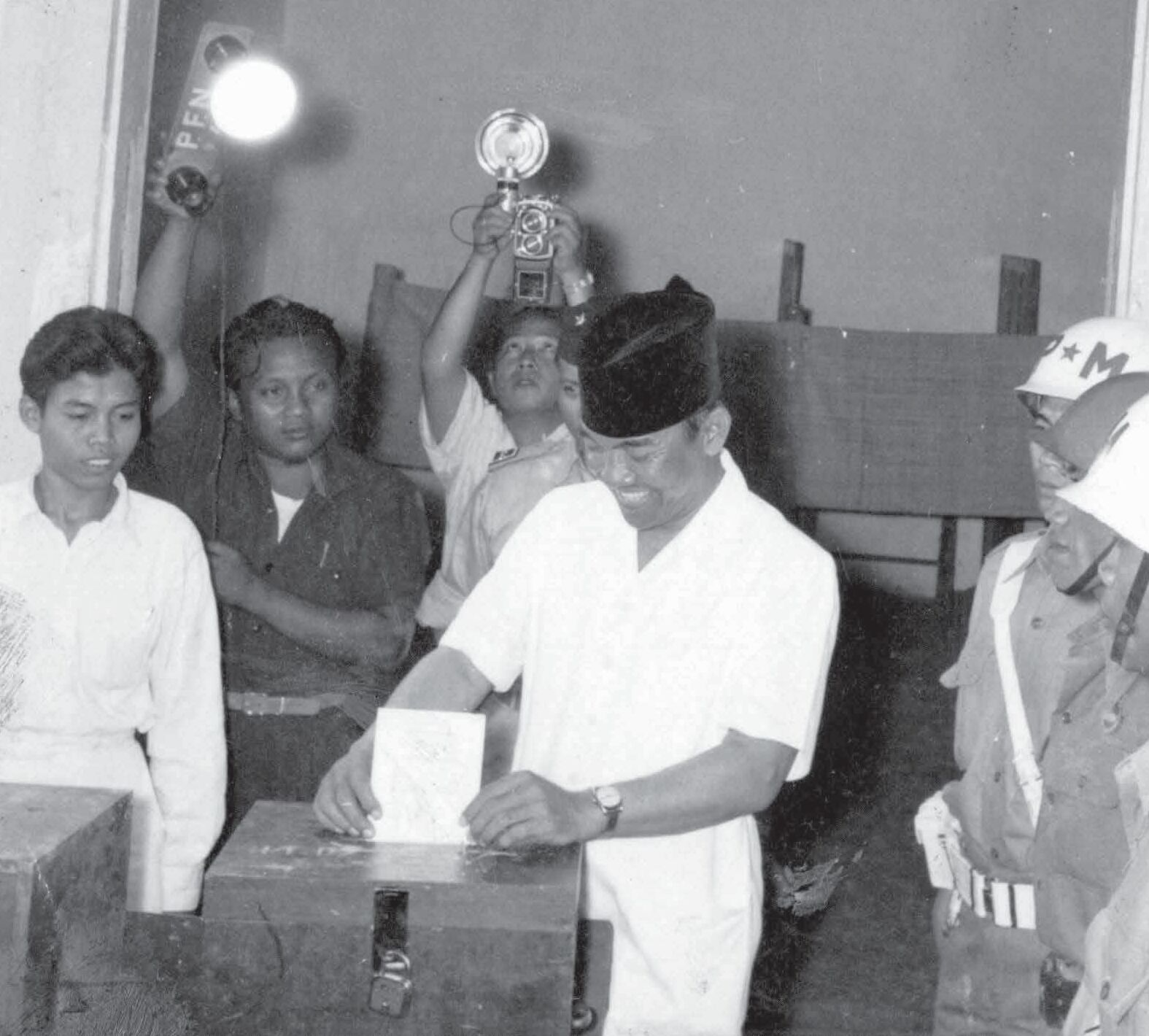
- President Sukarno voting in the 1955 elections
- President: Sukarno
- Prime Minister(s): Mohammad Natsir; Soekiman Wirjosandjojo; Wilopo; Ali Sastroamidjojo; Burhanuddin Harahap; Djuanda Kartawidjaja
- Key events: Provisional Constitution; 17 October affair; Bandung Conference; Constitutional Assembly; 1955 legislative election; 1955 Constitutional Assembly election; 1957 Permesta rebellion; 1959 Presidential Decree

The Liberal Democracy Era (Indonesian: Era Demokrasi Liberal) was a period in Indonesian political history, when the country was under a liberal democratic system. During this period, Indonesia held its first and only free and fair legislative election until 1999, but also saw continual political instability. The period began on 17 August 1950 following the dissolution of the federal United States of Indonesia, less than a year after its formation, and ended with the imposition of martial law and President Sukarno's decree, which resulted in the introduction of Guided Democracy on 5 July 1959.

On 17 August 1950, the Republic of the United States of Indonesia (RIS), which was a state created as a result of the Round Table Conference and the recognition of Indonesian sovereignty by the Netherlands, was officially dissolved. The system of government was also changed to a parliamentary democracy based on the Provisional Constitution of 1950.

The period of liberal democracy was marked by the growth of political parties and the enactment of a parliamentary system of government, but also by a long period of political instability, with governments falling one after another. The 1955 legislative elections saw the first free and fair elections in Indonesian history, as well as the only free and fair election until the 1999 legislative elections, which were held at the end of the New Order regime.

== History ==
=== Founding ===
Following more than 4 years of brutal fighting and violence, the Indonesian National Revolution was over, with the Dutch–Indonesian Round Table Conference resulting in the transference of sovereignty to the United States of Indonesia (RIS). However, the RIS government lacked cohesion inside and was opposed by many republicans. These factors among many others, resulted in the dissolution of all the constituents of the RIS, which were later merged again as part of the unitary Republic of Indonesia by 17 August 1950, the fifth anniversary of the Declaration of Independence.

However, divisions in Indonesian society began to appear. Regional differences in customs, morals, tradition, religion, the impact of Christianity and Marxism, and fears of Javanese political domination, all contributed to disunity. The new country was typified by poverty, low educational levels, and authoritarian traditions. Various separatist movements also arose to oppose the new Republic: the militant Darul Islam ('Islamic Domain') proclaimed an "Islamic State of Indonesia" and waged a guerrilla struggle against the Republic in West Java from 1948 to 1962; in Maluku, Ambonese, formerly of the Royal Netherlands East Indies Army, proclaimed an independent Republic of South Maluku; Permesta and PRRI rebels fought the Central government in Sulawesi and West Sumatra between 1955 and 1961.

The economy was in a disastrous state following three years of Japanese occupation and the following four years of war against the Dutch. In the hands of a young and inexperienced government, the economy was unable to boost production of food and other necessities to keep pace with the rapidly increasing population. Most of the population were illiterate, unskilled, and suffered from a dearth of management skills. Inflation was rampant, smuggling cost the central government much needed foreign exchange, and many of the plantations had been destroyed during the occupation and war.

=== Natsir Cabinet ===
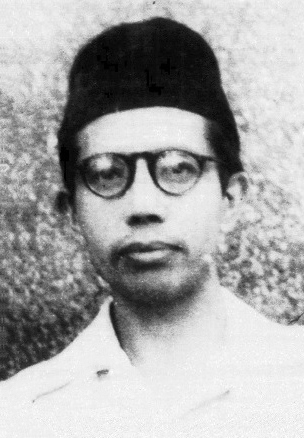
Prime Minister Mohammad Natsir, 1948

The first cabinet of the new nation was the Natsir Cabinet. It was formed by Prime Minister Mohammad Natsir with the backing of the Masyumi and the Indonesian Socialist Party (PSI), following a failed attempt at a coalition between the Masyumi and the Indonesian National Party (PNI). During this cabinet period, there were rebellions in almost all parts of Indonesia, problems in national security, such as the Darul Islam rebellion, Makassar Uprising, APRA coup d'état, and the Republic of South Maluku independence movement. Negotiations on the West Irian issue were also held during this cabinet, though these only resulted in a stalemate. On 22 January 1951, the parliament passed a vote of no confidence, resulting in Prime Minister Natsir returning his mandate to the president on 21 March 1951.

=== Soekiman Cabinet ===
Following the resignation of the Natsir Cabinet, attempts were made by political leaders, such as Sartono, to form a coalition government between Masyumi and the PNI. However, this proved to be difficult, as disagreements arose, including over the turnover tax, the regional councils, the West Irian issue, and seat distribution in such a cabinet. Eventually, an agreement was reached, with Soekiman Wirjosandjojo serving as prime minister. Notably, no one from the PSI and the Natsir faction of the Masyumi was a part of the cabinet.

The Soekiman cabinet was notable for its poor relations with the army and its suppression of the Indonesian Communist Party (PKI), following a series of militant strikes between June and August 1951. The first (and only) crackdown against the communists in Indonesia up until the events of the 30 September Movement. The Soekiman cabinet would eventually fall due to a foreign policy crisis, which committed Indonesia to the 'free world.' Resulting in the resignation of Foreign Minister Achmad Soebardjo and the fall of the whole cabinet in February 1952.

=== Wilopo Cabinet ===
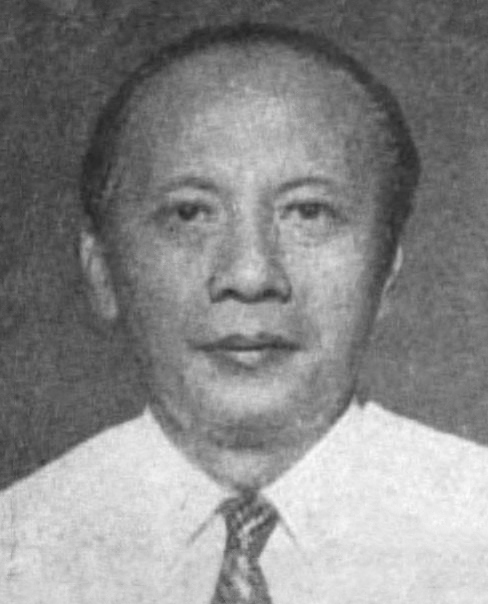
Prime Minister Wilopo

After the fall of the Soekiman cabinet, another Masyumi-PNI cabinet followed, this time, it was led by the PNI, under Prime Minister Wilopo. During the Wilopo cabinet, a major political realignment occurred. The PNI was growing suspicious of the Masyumi and was looking to postpone elections, fearing it might be won overwhelmingly by the Masyumi. This coincided with the PKI's new national united front strategy, which saw the party offer its support to the PNI, and didn't denounce the current cabinet, as it had done with the Soekiman cabinet. Meanwhile, the Masyumi was experiencing a split, as the Nahdlatul Ulama (NU) formed their own party, following doctrinal disputes.

Under the Wilopo cabinet, economic conditions began to worsen, as the economic boom that occurred during the Korean War was over. Prices of exports began to fall, notably rubber, which fell by 71%. This led to the cabinet cutting expenditures, including the budget of the army. However, the Wilopo Cabinet's proposals were unpopular with the army. The Army's high command came into dispute with the parliament in what it saw as excessive civilian meddling within military affairs. After a dismissal of a pro-government officer in July 1952, the parliament began demanding a significant restructuring of armed forces leadership, and after three months tensions culminated in thousands of demonstrators mobilized by the army in Jakarta.

President Sukarno managed to temper the demonstrators and assure the army officers, but refused to concede to any demands. Soon after the incident, a significant proportion of the army's high command was replaced. In March 1953, the cabinet fell, after what is now called the Tanjung Morawa affair, where police killed five peasants near Medan while removing squatters from foreign-owned estate lands. Before a vote of no confidence could be taken in parliament, the cabinet returned its mandate to Sukarno on 16 March 1953.

=== Sastroamidjojo Cabinet I ===
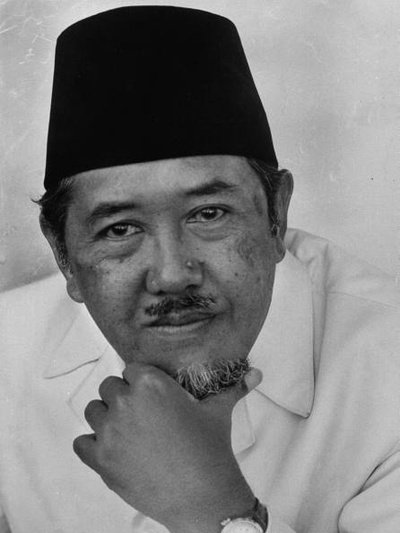
Prime Minister Ali Sastroamidjojo

After over six weeks of bargaining and five attempts at various party combinations, a new cabinet led by the PNI, with support by the NU, was formed with Ali Sastroamidjojo serving as Prime Minister. This time, the Masyumi was excluded, along with the PSI. Under the Ali Sastroamidjojo's first cabinet, the bureaucracy was expanded with more PNI officials, the economy was under a period of Indonesianization, with the government encouraging indigenous businessmen to open new firms. In practice, however, many new firms were bogus fronts for arrangements between government supporters and Chinese, which became known as "Ali Baba firms," in which an Indonesian (‘Ali’) was front man for a Chinese (‘Baba’) entrepreneur.

In April 1955, the Bandung conference was held, and it represented a triumph for the Ali Sastroamidjojo government. Around 29 states, attended the conference. Those present included Zhou Enlai, Jawaharlal Nehru, Phạm Văn Đồng, Mohammad Ali Bogra and Gammal Abdel Nasser. Ali Sastroamidjojo also continued the duties of the previous cabinet to carry out elections. On 31 May 1954, the Central and Regional Election Committees were formed. The plan at that time was that elections for the legislative branch would be held on September 29 and for the Constitutional Assembly would be held on December 15. However, again as experienced by the Wilopo Cabinet, the Ali Sastroamidjojo Cabinet dissolved in July 1955 and was replaced by the Burhanuddin Harahap Cabinet the following month, after a deteriorating economy, which resulted in the NU withdrawing, and the collapse of the cabinet.

=== Burhanuddin Harahap Cabinet ===
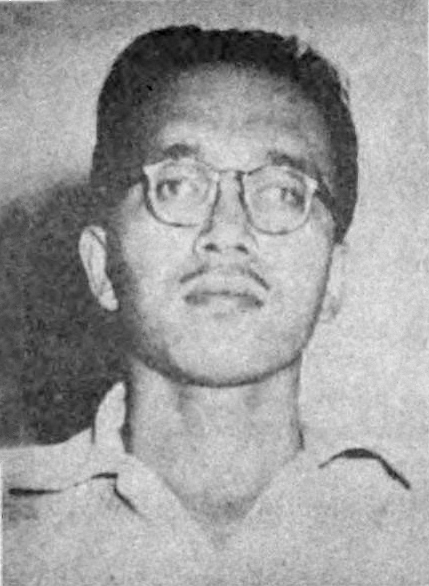
Prime Minister Burhanuddin Harahap, 1952

Following the dissolution of the First Ali Sastroamidjojo cabinet, vice president Mohammad Hatta announced the names of three candidates for the new cabinet formation, namely Wilopo, Soekiman, and Assaat. However, these three candidates agreed to choose Hatta as prime minister and Minister of Defense. However, because Hatta was still serving as vice president, Hatta appointed Burhanuddin Harahap to form a cabinet. Burhanuddin Harahap's cabinet consisted of a coalition of thirteen different parties, though in practice the cabinet was dominated by the Masyumi, with other parties only being added as complementary. The PNI did not sit in this cabinet, but the PNI together with the Great Indonesia Party (PIR) led by Wongsonegoro, the PKI, led by D. N. Aidit, and other parties formed and acted as the opposition. The army was not entirely pleased with the newly formed cabinet, since it believed many of the new cabinet members to be as corrupt as their predecessors. But it was pleased at the opportunity to arrest several PNI figures for corruption.

Under the cabinet, the long-awaited 1955 legislative and constitutional assembly elections took place. Rather than resolving political issues, the elections merely helped to draw the battle-lines more precisely. Under Burhanuddin Harahap, harmonization between the government and the army began, as well as the termination of the Netherlands-Indonesia Union, as a form of protest over the West Irian issue. The cabinet resigned in early March.

=== Sastroamidjojo Cabinet II ===
The next cabinet was again led by Ali Sastroamidjojo, who became prime minister again. Unlike the other cabinets, this cabinet was the only cabinet that governed through elections during the era of Liberal Democracy. The cabinet was notable for the fact that 17 of the 24 new ministers were without previous cabinet experience. Under the cabinet, the Round Table Conference (KMB) was cancelled unilaterally, both formally and materially, cooperation continued with Asian-African countries, the decisions of the Asian-African Conference in Bandung were implemented, and domestic reforms were enacted. After a year, the cabinet had to return their mandate to the President, following a split between the PNI and Masyumi parties.

=== Djuanda Cabinet ===
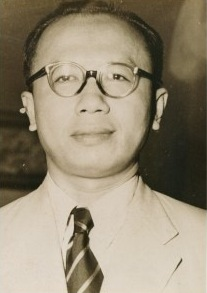
Prime Minister Djuanda Kartawidjaja

Following the fall of the Second Ali Sastroamidjojo cabinet, president Sukarno expressed his desire for a gotong royong (mutual assistance) cabinet, in which all of the four major parties, including the PKI would work together for the national interest. However, following vociferous opposition from the other parties and the Army, Sukarno was forced to back down. On 15 March, he asked PNI chairman, and former Mayor of Jakarta Suwiryo to form a cabinet, but he failed, with the result that Sukarno himself called a meeting on 14 April of party leaders and military officers, at which they were all asked if they were prepared to join the cabinet. The Masyumi, most of whose members refused to serve in the cabinet, accused Sukarno of acting illegally, but to no avail. The party later expelled its two members who joined the cabinet. Sukarno appointed cabinet veteran Djuanda Kartawidjaja to head a cabinet made up of qualified individuals who did not represent any parties. The cabinet was announced on 8 April and appointed by Sukarno the following day at the Merdeka Palace.

Unlike other cabinets, this cabinet was the only cabinet in power through a mandate given directly by the president. This cabinet was forced to resign because of changes in the political system made by President Sukarno through the Presidential Decree of July 5, 1959.

=== Disestablishment ===
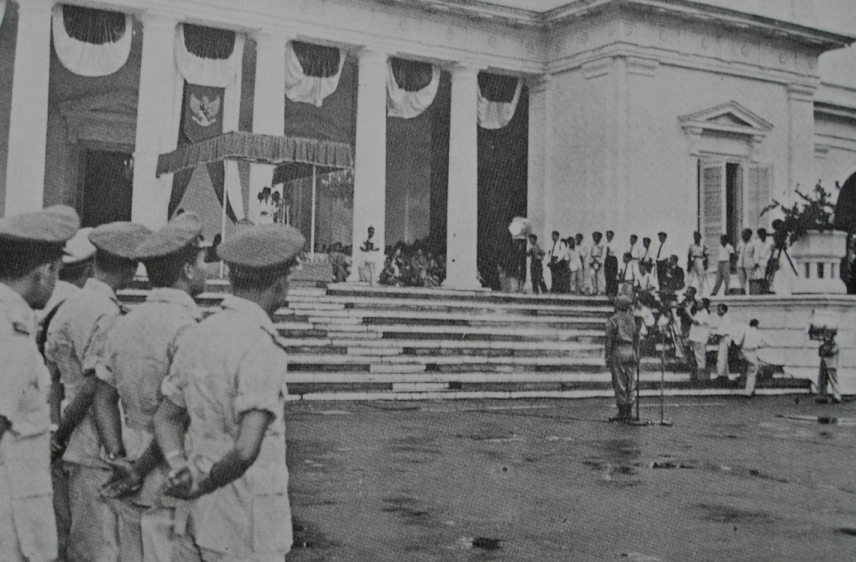
President Sukarno, partly obscured, at top of steps, reading the decree

Even as early as 1956, president Sukarno was openly criticizing the parliamentary democracy, stating that it was 'based upon inherent conflict' that ran counter to the Indonesian concept of harmony as the natural state of human relationships. Instead, he sought a system based on the traditional village system of discussion and consensus, which occurred under the guidance of village elders. He proposed a threefold blend of nasionalisme ('nationalism'), agama ('religion'), and komunisme ('communism') into a co-operative 'Nasakom' government. This was intended to appease the three main factions in Indonesian politics – the army, Islamic groups, and the communists.

With the support of the military, he proclaimed in February 1957, 'Guided Democracy', and proposed a cabinet of representing all the political parties of importance (including the PKI). This shift into a more authoritarian form of democracy culminated on 5 July 1959. Sukarno issued a Presidential Decree of July 5, 1959, which among other things contained the dissolution of the Constituent Assembly and the replacement of the constitution from the 1950 Constitution to the 1945 Constitution again. This event marked the end of Parliamentary Democracy and the beginning of the Guided Democracy Era. The government then formed Provisional People's Consultative Assembly (MPRS) institutions in a guided democracy that implemented a political system of balance.

== Government and politics ==
=== Constitution ===
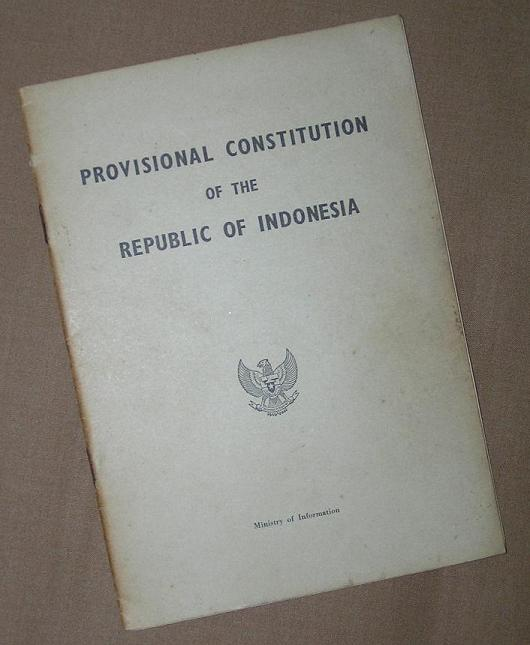
The official translation of the 1950 provisional Constitution

The Provisional Constitution of 1950 differed markedly from the 1945 Constitution in many ways; it mandated a parliamentary system of government, and stipulated at length constitutional guarantees for human rights, drawing heavily on the 1948 UN's Universal Declaration of Human Rights. It was abrogated on 9 July 1959 when President Sukarno issued a decree dissolving the Constitutional Assembly and restoring the 1945 Constitution of Indonesia.

=== Prime minister ===
The position of Prime Minister of Indonesia (Indonesian: Perdana Menteri Republik Indonesia) was the main head of government of Indonesia during the Liberal Democracy Era, with the president officially only acting as a figurehead. During this period, the prime minister was in charge of the Cabinet of Indonesia, one of the three branches of government along with the Provisional People's Representative Council and the president. Under the constitution of the unitary state, the cabinet was once again responsible to parliament, with the prime minister appointed by the president. Due to the instability of the coalition cabinets, prime ministers often faced votes of no confidence. Every major policy change had a chance to be opposed, either by the government or opposition. As such, some cabinets lasted only a few months.

=== Political parties ===
Throughout the Liberal Democracy era, a large number of political parties existed within Indonesia. The main four were the Indonesian National Party (PNI), the Masyumi Party, the Nahdlatul Ulama, and the Communist Party of Indonesia (PKI). Other smaller parties existed, including the Christian Party, Catholic Party, and Socialist Party. The large numbers of parties resulted in a proliferation of political parties and the deals brokered between them for shares of cabinets seats resulted in rapid turnover coalition governments including 17 cabinets between 1945 and 1958.

== Timeline of events ==
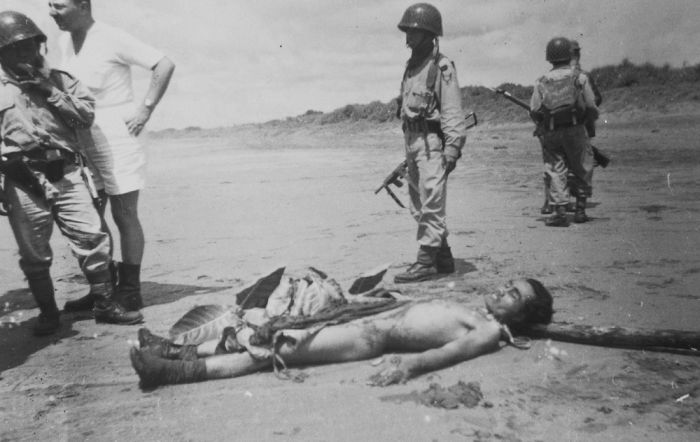
A dead militant following an attack against a rubber plantation.

- 1948–62: Darul Islam rebellions begin in West Java, spread to other provinces but conclude with the execution of its leader Kartosoewiryo.
- 1952, 17 October: General Nasution is suspended as army chief of staff following army indiscipline over command and support that threatens the government.
- 1955, April: The city of Bandung hosts the Bandung Conference. The meeting, which was an important step toward the Non-Aligned Movement, was attended by world leaders including Zhou Enlai of China, Jawaharlal Nehru of India, Gamal Abdel Nasser of Egypt and Josip Broz Tito of Yugoslavia.
- 1955, September: Indonesia holds general parliamentary elections; the last free national elections until 1999; support for the parties is widely distributed with four parties each gaining 16–22 per cent and the remaining votes split between 24 parties.
- 1958, 18 May: US Air Force pilot Allen Lawrence Pope is shot down over Ambon, revealing covert American support of regional rebellions, and ends the Dulles brothers', Allen and John, failure to subvert the Sukarno government. Pope sunk the Indonesian Navy vessel, the KRI Hang Toeah, and heavily damaged its sister, the KRI Sawega. Bailed out and captured by Indonesian armed forces on board the KRI Pulau Rengat.
- 1950s/60s: The military articulate the doctrines of dwifungsi and hankamrata: i.e. a military roles in the country's socio-political development as well as security; and a requirement that the resources of the people be at the call of the armed forces.
- 1959, 5 July: With armed forces support, Sukarno issues a decree dissolving the Constituent Assembly and reintroducing the Constitution of 1945 with strong presidential powers, and assumes the additional role of Prime Minister, which completes the structure of 'Guided Democracy'.

== See also ==
- History of Indonesia
- Prime Minister of Indonesia
- Cabinets of Indonesia
