= Arnold Mononutu =

Indonesian politician and nationalist (1896–1983)

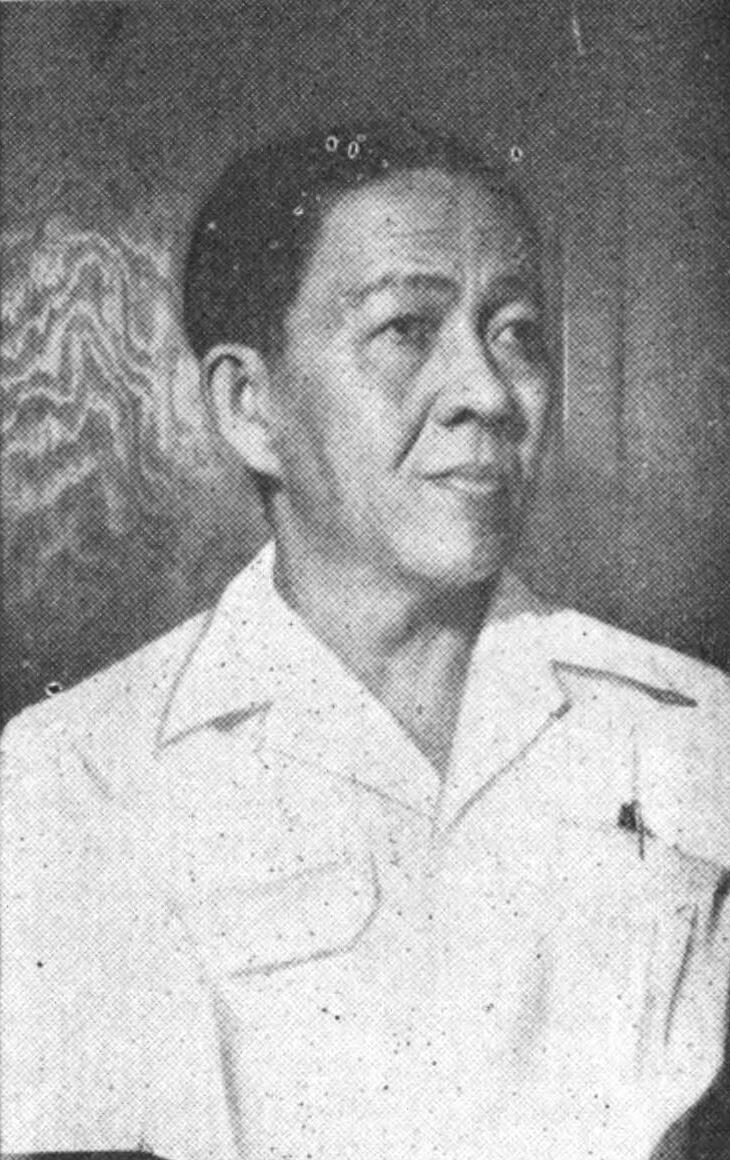
- Portrait, c. 1940s

8th Minister of Information
- In office 20 December 1949 – 6 September 1950
- Prime Minister: Mohammad Hatta
- Preceded by: R. Syamsudin
- Succeeded by: R. Syamsudin
- In office 27 April 1951 – 30 July 1953
- Prime Minister: Soekiman Wirjosandjojo; Wilopo
- Preceded by: M. A. Pellaupessy
- Succeeded by: Ferdinand Lumban Tobing

1st Indonesian Ambassador to China
- In office 28 August 1953 – 1955
- Preceded by: Office established
- Succeeded by: Sukarjo Wiryopranoto

Rector of Hasanuddin University
- In office 1960–1965
- Preceded by: K.R.M.T. Djokomarsaid
- Succeeded by: M. Natsir Said

Personal details
- Born: Arnoldus Isaac Zacharias Mononutu; 4 December 1896 Manado, Dutch East Indies
- Died: 5 September 1983 (aged 86) Jakarta, Indonesia
- Party: PNI

Arnoldus Isaac Zacharias Mononutu (4 December 1896 – 5 September 1983) was an Indonesian nationalist, politician, and national hero of Indonesia from North Sulawesi, who served as Minister of Information from 1949 until 1950, and the again from 1951 until 1953. He later became the first Indonesia Ambassador to China, as well as the third Rector of Hasanuddin University. A member of the Indonesian National Party, Mononutu was also involved in the struggle for Indonesia's independence. Having gained his sense of nationalism during his post-secondary studies in the Netherlands. In 2020, he was posthumously given the honorary title of National Hero of Indonesia.

== Early life ==
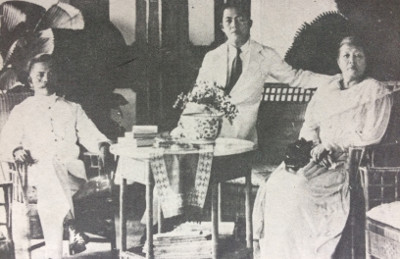
A young Mononutu with his parents

Arnold Isaac Zacharias Mononutu was born in Manado on 4 December 1896 to Karel Charles Wilson Mononutu and Agustina van der Slot. Both his father and grandfather were prominent figures in their time. His father was a civil servant or ambtenaar (nl) in the Dutch East Indies colonial administration. His grandfather (also named Arnold Mononutu) was the first Minahasan to complete studies at the school for the training of native physicians (STOVIA or School tot Opleiding van Inlandsche Artsen) in Batavia (now Jakarta).

When Mononutu was two years old, his father was assigned a position in Gorontalo. Four younger siblings were born in Gorontalo, but all four died when they were between five and six months old. In 1903, Mononutu went to the Dutch language elementary school (ELS or Europeesche Lagere School (nl)) in Gorontalo. He continued his studies at the ELS in Manado after his father was reassigned to a position in Manado. In 1913, Mononutu went to the Dutch secondary school (HBS or Hogere burgerschool (nl)) in Batavia where he met and became friends with AA Maramis (also from Minahasa) and Achmad Subardjo.

== Time in Europe ==
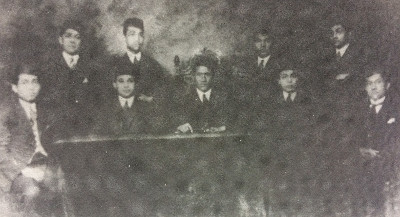
Mononutu with others officers of Perhimpunan Indonesia in 1925

In 1920, Mononutu headed to Europe to start his studies in the Netherlands. After a couple of years of taking preparatory courses to enroll in a university, he decided to enroll in The Hague Academy of International Law or Académie de droit international de La Haye in The Hague. Mononutu initially did not have nationalistic ideals. However, after attending the association for Indonesian students in the Netherlands or Indische Vereeniging or Perhimpunan Indonesia, Mononutu began to realize the nationalism of Indonesia. He became more involved in the organization and was elected as vice president, the same period in which Mohammad Hatta was elected as treasurer.

When Soekiman Wirjosandjojo was president of the organization, Mononutu was asked to become a representative of Indische Vereeniging among the student organizations in Paris. During his time in Paris, the Dutch Political Intelligence Department or Politieke Inlichtingen Dienst became suspicious of Mononutu's activities. The colonial government in Indonesia spread false rumors to his father that he was being sympathetic to the communists. His father was threatened to be removed from his position if he continued to send money to Mononutu. When his father stopped sending money to Mononutu, he became dependent on his Indonesian friends. He returned to the Netherlands from France and was allowed to stay with Ali Sastroamidjojo and his family. Upon secretly receiving money from his father through his uncle who was travelling to the Netherlands, Mononutu was able to pay all his debts and return home to Indonesia in September 1927.

== Return to Indonesia ==
Upon returning to Indonesia, Mononutu was immediately involved in the local nationalist efforts. He became a member of the newly formed Indonesian National Party or Partai Nasional Indonesia (PNI). Mononut also met its founder, Sukarno, for the first time. Mononutu rented a room in the same house as Suwirjo and Sugondo Djojopuspito both of whom were leaders of the Indonesian Students Association or Persatuan Pelajar Pelajar Indonesia. This organization was part of the Second Youth Congress in 1928 that produced the Youth Pledge or Sumpah Pemuda. This pledge proclaimed the three ideals of one motherland, one nation, and one language. The future Indonesian national anthem Indonesia Raya by Wage Rudolf Supratman was first heard in this venue.

Mononutu had started work for a Japanese oil exploration company Mitsui Buissan Kaisha, but would decide to work for much less pay at the newly established People's College or Perguruan Rakyat. He managed and taught courses in schools established by Perguruan Rakyat. Other instructors included Mohammad Yamin and Gunawan Mangunkusumo (the brother of Tjipto Mangunkusumo). The schools had a total of around 300 students enrolled. In 1930, Mononutu had to leave his position at Perguruan Rakyat and return to Manado, because he received word that his mother was sick.

== Time in Manado and Ternate ==
Mononutu would stay in Manado for 12 years from 1930 to 1942. During this time, he became the director of a copra cooperative. The cooperative had around 500 members who were scattered throughout the regions of Minahasa and Bolaang Mongondow. Mononutu was able to secure credit from the People's General Credit Bank or Algemene Volkscredietbank (now Bank Rakyat Indonesia) to cover the debts of the copra farmers. This allowed the farmers to sell their copra to the cooperative, which offered more stabile and standardized prices. The copra was in turn exported through the Nationale Handelsbank, a Dutch bank that was established to finance trade between the Netherlands and the Dutch East Indies.

At the beginning of the Japanese occupation in 1942, Mononutu was sought by the Japanese because of his nationalistic stance and relationship with nationalist organizations. With the help of a sympathetic Japanese named Yamanishi, Mononutu fled to the island of Ternate (the northern part of the Maluku Islands) and remained there until the end of the occupation.

== Involvement in the State of East Indonesia ==
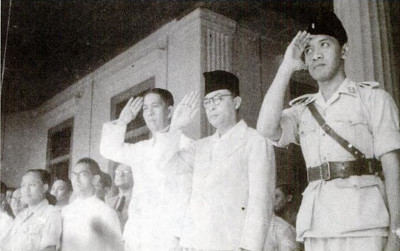
Mononutu (3rd from right) with Mohammad Hatta and Sultan Hamengkubuwono IX

After hearing of the 1945 Proclamation of Indonesian Independence, Mononutu focused his efforts to help the people of North Maluku to determine the best response to the proclamation. He was one of the individuals who established a political organization called the Unity of Indonesia or Persatuan Indonesia. A newspaper called the Tower of Independence or Menara Merdeka was published to promote the ideals of Persatuan Indonesia. The paper promoted a pro-republic message and criticized efforts by the Dutch to establish a separate state apart from the recently proclaimed Republic of Indonesia.

Efforts by the Dutch to find a federal solution for Indonesia included the establishment of the State of East Indonesia or Negara Indonesia Timur (NIT) in 1946. Mononutu became a member of the NIT parliament and headed the pro-republic group of parliament members. He focused his efforts to persuade other members of parliament to support the notion of unifying NIT with the Republic of Indonesia. After the Dutch military offensive against the Republic of Indonesia Operation Product in 1947, Mononutu established the Unified Struggle for Indonesian Independence or Gabungan Perjuangan Kemerdekaan Indonesia. This organization sought to highlight the actions of the Dutch to keep Indonesia as its colony. In February 1948, he led a delegation of NIT officials to visit and meet with the leaders of the Republic of Indonesia in Yogyakarta. In 1949, NIT became a constituent of the newly formed United States of Indonesia or Republik Indonesia Serikat (RIS), which was then dissolved on 17 August 1950 and replaced by a unitary Republic of Indonesia.

== Information Minister ==
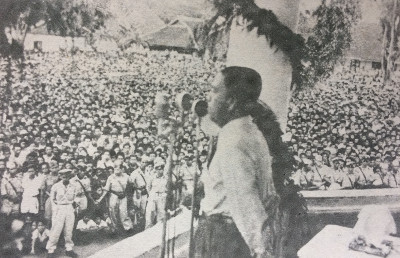
Mononutu giving a speech in Garut

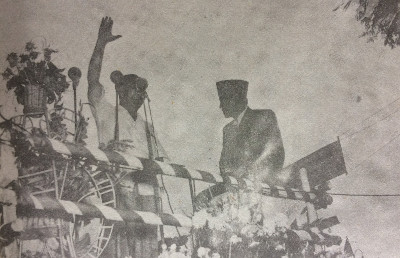
Mononutu with Sukarno in Purwodadi

Mononutu was appointed Information Minister in the Indonesian government on three separate occasions:

- In the Republic of the United States of Indonesia Cabinet from 20 December 1949 to 6 September 1950
- In the Sukiman Cabinet from 27 April 1951 to April 1952
- In the Wilopo Cabinet from 3 April 1952 to 30 Juli 1953

During his time as information minister, several regions in Indonesia were rocked by rebellious uprisings including in West Java (Legion of the Just Ruler), South Sulawesi (by Andi Aziz), and Maluku (by Chris Soumokil). Mononutu along with Sukarno visited these regions and in large open-air meetings promoted the ideal of a unified nation.

== Rector of Hasanuddin University ==
In 1960, Mononutu was asked by Sukarno to become rector of Hasanuddin University. In the five years as rector, the student population grew from 4000 students to 8000 students. When he started, the university only had three faculties: economics, law, and medicine. The university would add six more faculties during his tenure: agriculture, animal sciences, engineering, literature, sciences, and social politics.

== Honors ==
On 15 February 1961, Mononutu was awarded the Bintang Mahaputera Utama, the highest honor given to a civilian by the Indonesian government. On 10 November 2020, he was posthumously conferred the honorary title of National Hero of Indonesia by President Joko Widodo in a ceremony at the State Palace.
