= 17 October affair =

1952 political crisis in Indonesia

- Part of the liberal democracy period in Indonesia
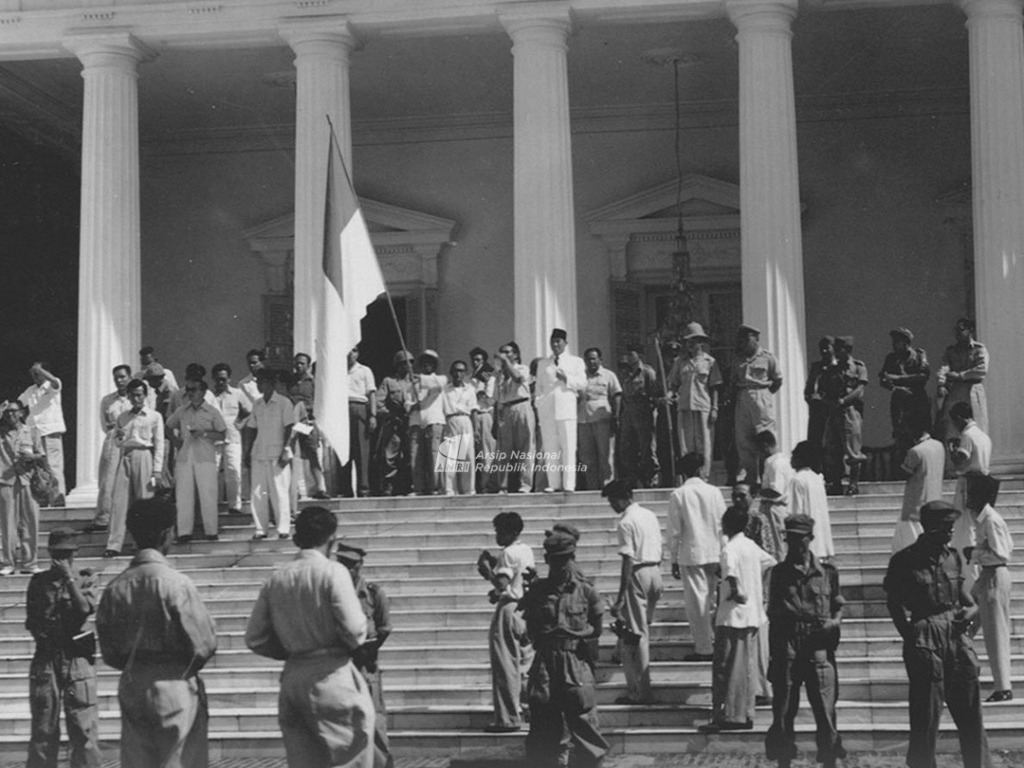
- Situation at the Merdeka Palace during the affair
- Date: 17 October 1952
- Location: Jakarta, Indonesia
- Caused by: Opposition to the Wilopo Cabinet's centralization and demobilization scheme within the Indonesian army
- Goals: Dissolution of the Provisional House of Representatives; Holding of elections

The 17 October affair (Indonesian: Peristiwa 17 Oktober, lit. '17 October event') was an event during which Indonesian soldiers pressured the president to disband the Provisional People's Representative Council, at the behest of the administration's chief of staff, along with the commander of the armed forces. The demand was made of President Sukarno while the Merdeka Palace was surrounded.

Due to tensions regarding potential army reorganization to conserve budgets, the Indonesian Army's high command disputed with the parliament regarding excessive civilian meddling in military affairs. After the dismissal of a pro-government officer in July 1952, the parliament began demanding a significant restructuring of armed forces leadership. After three months, tensions culminated in thousands of demonstrators mobilized by the army in Jakarta. Sukarno managed to temper the demonstrators and assure the army officers but refused to concede to any demands. Soon after the incident, a significant proportion of the army's high command was replaced, including Nasution and Simatupang.

== Background ==
During 1952, the Indonesian government faced a fiscal crisis due to a drop in government revenues and current account deficit as the economic boom due to the Korean War levelled out. Government officials under the Wilopo Cabinet began cutting down on expenses, including civilian and military service members, which would include 60,000 soldiers being retired. Demobilization after the Indonesian National Revolution had occurred in the past, but not many had been forcefully retired. Beyond the demobilization, the Indonesian Army had also undergone a "reorganization" program involving many demotion or transfer of local military commanders, which was unpopular among them. This generally split the army into two factions: those who preferred reorganization and worked with the civilian administration's budget reduction programs and the traditional military officers at risk of reorganization, including many officers trained by Japanese occupation forces before independence, under the PETA organization. This reorganization process had been coordinated by the Army's leadership, including Armed Forces Chief Tahi Bonar Simatupang and Army Chief of Staff Abdul Haris Nasution.

For 1952, three-quarters of the army's budget was spent on salaries, limiting the amount of purchasable equipment for renewal, and even so the salary allocations were minimal. In mid-1952, the army reorganizers decided to begin a demobilization process late that year, which would demobilize 80,000 soldiers, out of 200,000 at that time. While pensions would be provided, the plan was unpopular among many of the rank and file to be discharged and among the traditional officers. These traditional officers had strong connections with President Sukarno's Indonesian National Party (PNI) and other opposition parties. Sukarno himself had been opposed to many of the changes in the army and had occasionally intervened in the personnel policy. Between June and July 1952, one Colonel Bambang Supeno, a distant relative of Sukarno's, began to gather support to petition for the removal of Nasution from army leadership. After a tense meeting of regional commanders and a letter from Supeno criticizing his superiors to the civilian government, he was removed from his post on 17 July. Supeno was one of the most senior army officers who had formulated an official military code of principles and was a supporter of the "traditional" faction, espousing that the army should focus on local defense and the utilization of its abundant workforce.

Following Supeno's dismissal, the parliament began issuing demands to restructure the Indonesian Army's leadership and the Ministry of Defense, particularly removing Simatupang and Nasution. The military leadership saw this as excessive civilian interference in defense affairs and began holding meetings to discuss a countermove. The Wilopo Cabinet itself suffered from infighting regarding the demands, with the Indonesian Socialist Party and the Indonesian Christian Party threatening to withdraw from the government coalition should Defense Minister Hamengkubuwono IX be removed. On 23 September, a motion of no-confidence on the defence ministry's policies by parliamentary defence section secretary Zainul Baharuddin, cosigned by the Murba Party and the Labour Party members, was submitted. On 10 October, a modified motion was submitted to draw the Indonesian National Party's support. Around that time, the highest-ranking regional army commanders had gathered in Jakarta for a meeting, including Maludin Simbolon, A. E. Kawilarang, and Gatot Subroto. The situation in early October was tense, with military guards posted to the parliament building. Baharuddin's motion failed on 15 October, and a more moderate motion proposed two days earlier by I. J. Kasimo, of the Catholic Party, was instead approved by the government. More importantly, a stronger motion by the PNI's Manai Sophiaan, which allowed civilian politicians to alter the armed forces' leadership, also passed on 16 October.

== Events ==
On the morning of 17 October 1952, thousands of demonstrators brought into Jakarta by army trucks arrived in front of the parliament building. The demonstrators demanded the dissolution of parliament, carrying placards with related messages. There were around 5,000 people by 8 AM, and they broke into the parliament building, where they smashed chairs and damaged the cafeteria. The group was apparently organized by Colonel Moestopo, head of the army's dental service. The crowd moved across the city, growing as some bystanders joined in. The group collectively presented a petition to Vice President Mohammad Hatta, and on several occasions Dutch flags were taken off flagpoles and torn up. By the time they arrived in front of the Merdeka Palace, there were some 30,000 people in the crowd. Beyond the large crowd, the army also pointed several tanks and artillery pieces at the presidential palace. The demonstrators remained in the front of the palace's fences. While this was ongoing, Nasution did not physically participate, as he did not want to appear involved with the movement; he instead invited UN Representative John Reid for lunch.

Shortly after the crowd's arrival, President Sukarno walked out and addressed the crowd from the steps of the presidential palace, promising elections in the short term. However, Sukarno denied the demonstrators' request to dissolve parliament, stating that such actions would be dictatorial. This speech largely managed to calm down the demonstrators, and after the conclusion of his speech, he received cheers, and the crowd largely dispersed. Sometime past 10 AM, seventeen high-ranking officers, including five of the seven army territorial commanders, met the president. The closed-door meeting lasted for an hour and a half and also involved Hatta, Wilopo, Cabinet Secretary A.K. Pringgodigdo, and parliament speaker A. M. Tambunan. The army officers demanded the president dissolve parliament. According to historian Ruth McVey, the officers would have likely accepted a compromise, whereas the parliament would remain but would no longer interfere with army leadership. Sukarno, however, refused to either dissolve parliament, to make public statements supporting the army, or to propose a compromise otherwise, and he sent away the officers after previously promising that he would satisfy all parties.

Once the officers had left the palace, still on 17 October, Sukarno spoke in a broadcast to appeal for calm. Telephone and telegraph connections in Jakarta ceased that day starting at 11 AM, and a curfew was implemented, with meetings over five people being restricted. Six parliament members (including former prime minister Soekiman Wirjosandjojo) were arrested, and several newspapers were banned. However, after three days, the bans, arrests, and other measures had been lifted, and army activity in Jakarta significantly returned to normal.

== Impact ==
The army failed to achieve its objective of mobilizing demonstrators to coerce Sukarno, and its high command faced internal and external replacements. Three of the seven territorial commanders were removed by their subordinates in October 1952. In the four cities serving as the headquarters of the unchanged territorial commands – Medan, Bandung, Semarang, and Banjarmasin – anti-parliament demonstrations occurred after 17 October. Once the parliament had reconvened in late November, both Simatupang and Nasution were removed from their posts, with Simatupang's office being abolished and Nasution being replaced by Bambang Soegeng. The affair and the ensuing coups in the territorial commands deprived the army's high command of significant powers while strengthening local officers and the overall armed forces command. Continued disputes between the military and the parliament also forced local territorial commands to seek sources of funding beyond the central government through deals with local businesses, and this grew to a point where this income exceeded central budgets. It also strengthened the traditionalist officers at the expense of the more modern, professional ones. Under Soegeng, the army attempted to resolve this issue of factionalism but failed, and once Soegeng resigned in 1955, Nasution returned to his post as Army Chief of Staff.

== Bibliography ==
- Feith, Herbert (2006). The Decline of Constitutional Democracy in Indonesia. Equinox Publishing. ISBN 978-979-3780-45-0.
- Feith, Herbert (2009). The Wilopo Cabinet, 1952-1953: A Turning Point in Post-Revolutionary Indonesia. Equinox Publishing. ISBN 978-602-8397-15-5.
- Sejarah TNI-AD, 1945-1973: Riwayat hidup singkat pimpinan tentara nasional Indonesia Angkatan Darat (in Indonesian). Indonesian Armed Forces Historical Service. 1981.
- McVey, Ruth (1971). "The Post-Revolutionary Transformation of the Indonesian Army". Indonesia. 11 (11): 131–176. doi:10.2307/3350748. hdl:1813/53507. ISSN 0019-7289. JSTOR 3350748.
