= Mohammad Sardjan =

Indonesian politician

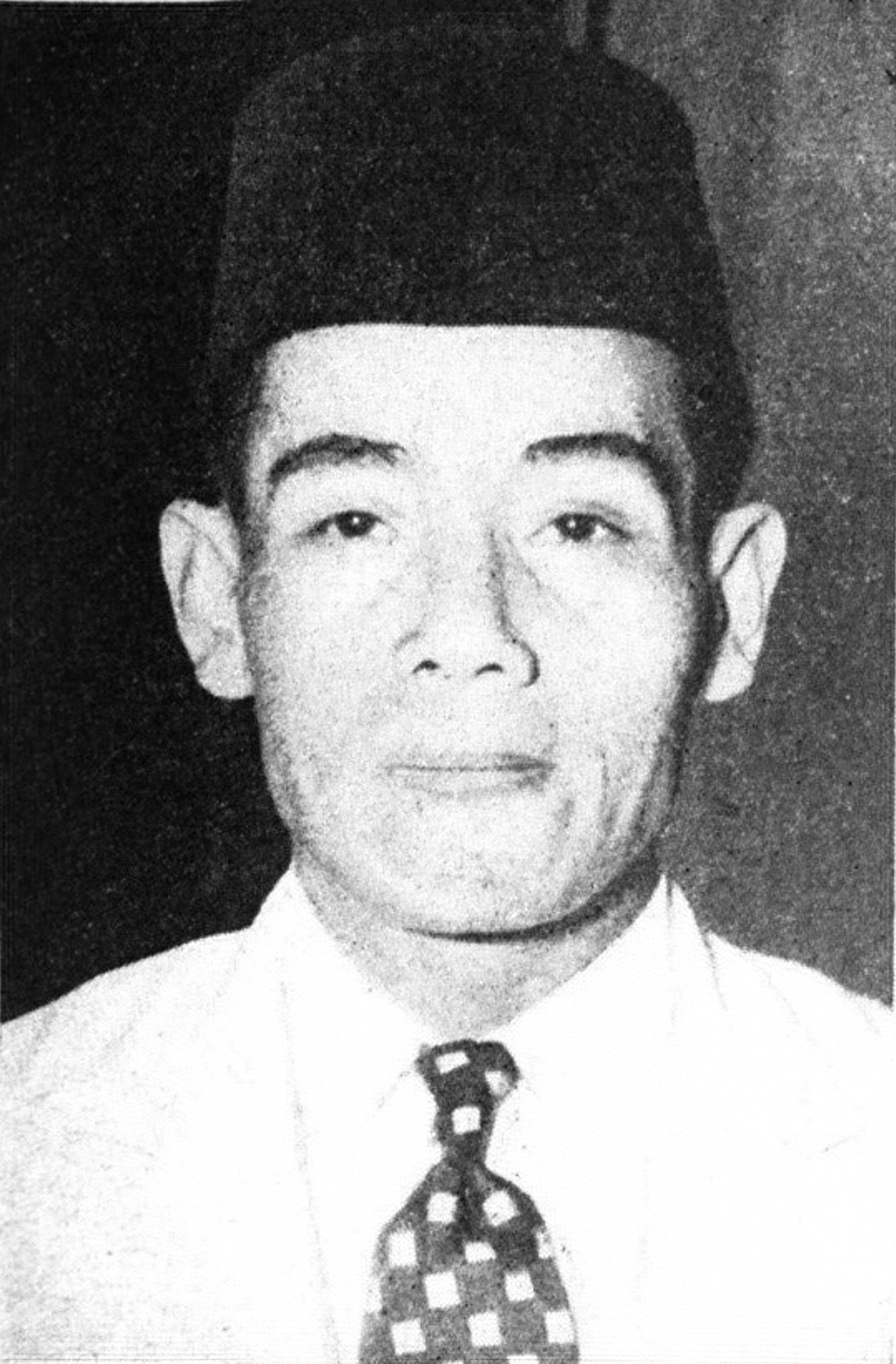

Minister of Agriculture
- In office 12 August 1955 – 3 March 1956
- Prime Minister: Burhanuddin Harahap
- Preceded by: Sadjarwo Djarwonagoro
- Succeeded by: Eny Karim
- In office 3 April 1952 – 30 July 1953
- Prime Minister: Wilopo
- Preceded by: Suwarto
- Succeeded by: Sadjarwo Djarwonagoro

Personal details
- Born: 4 June 1909 Kebumen, Dutch East Indies
- Died: 6 May 1992 (aged 82) Jakarta, Indonesia
- Party: Masyumi
- Spouse: Mustariati Sardjan

Mohammad Sardjan (4 June 1909 – 6 May 1992) was an Indonesian politician who served as Minister of Agriculture within the Wilopo and Burhanuddin Harahap Cabinets, in addition to being a member of the Central Indonesian National Committee, the People's Representative Council, and the Constitutional Assembly.

== Early life ==
Sardjan was born in Prembun, Kebumen Regency, today in Central Java, on 4 June 1909. He studied at an AMS in Surakarta, before working as a teacher for some time. He also joined the Jong Islamieten Bond in 1926, and in 1932 the Indonesian Islamic Union Party under H. O. S. Tjokroaminoto.

== Career ==
Prior to World War II, Sardjan worked as a newspaper editor in Jakarta between 1938 and 1938, and then moved to Yogyakarta where he became an editor for a different paper. After the conclusion of the war, Sardjan joined the Peasants Front of Indonesia, but he left due to conflicting ideologies - the Peasants Front was notably left-leaning. Instead, he joined the Indonesian Islamic Peasants' Union (STII), which was affiliated with the Masyumi Party. He became its chairman by 1947, and joined Masyumi upon the party's establishment. As a Masyumi member, Sardjan joined the Central Indonesian National Committee, becoming one of five Masyumi representatives in its Working Committee.

He was then appointed as the Minister of Agriculture in the Wilopo Cabinet between 1952 and 1953, and later again in the Burhanuddin Harahap Cabinet between 1955 and 1956. Between those two terms, he was also appointed in 1954 into an agricultural body formed by the president, representing the STII. Sardjan's views on agriculture opposed excessive exploitation of agricultural land, often citing "natural balance". Due to the resignation of several ministers in January 1956, Sardjan briefly served as ad interim Minister of Religious Affairs.

Outside of his terms as minister, Sardjan had been elected into the People's Representative Council after the 1955 Indonesian legislative election, representing East Java. He was also appointed a member of the Constitutional Assembly, and of Masyumi's executive committee since 1954.

== Views ==
During his time at the Constitutional Assembly, Sardjan championed for the recognition of unalienable fundamental rights, particularly democracy. Within Masyumi, Sardjan was also a staunch defender of democracy, as opposed to factions within the party who sought a sharia government.

== Death ==
Mohammad Sardjan died on 6 May 1992 in Jakarta, Indonesia.

== Personal life ==
Mohammad Sardjan was married to Mustariati Sardjan. The marriage resulted in, amongst others Titi Qadarsih. Qadarsih would later become an actress and a singer. Their son Toto Sardjan (Tauchid Mohammad) married the singer Henny Purwonegoro.

Mustariati Sardjan died on 12 June 1992, while Titi Qadarsih died on 22 October 2018.

== Bibliography ==
- Feith, Herbert (2006). The Decline of Constitutional Democracy in Indonesia. Equinox Publishing. ISBN 978-979-3780-45-0.
- Madinier, Remy (2015). Islam and Politics in Indonesia: The Masyumi Party between Democracy and Integralism. NUS Press. ISBN 978-9971-69-843-0.
