= Prawoto Mangkusasmito =

Indonesian politician (1910–1970)

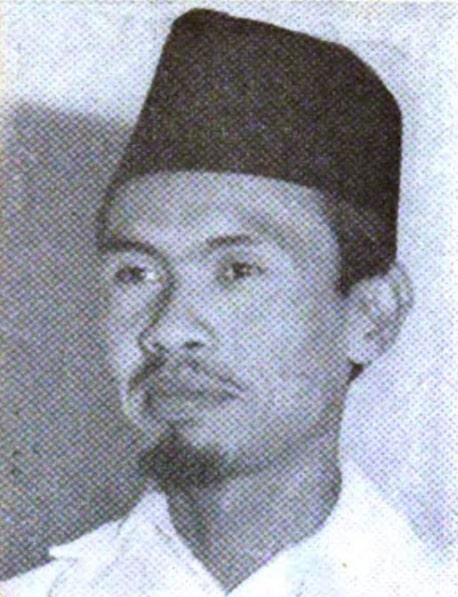
- Official portrait, c. 1954

3rd Chairman of the Masyumi Party
- In office April 1959 – September 1960
- Preceded by: Mohammad Natsir
- Succeeded by: Office abolished

7th Deputy Prime Minister of Indonesia
- In office 3 April 1952 – 3 June 1953
- Prime Minister: Wilopo
- Preceded by: Raden Suwiryo
- Succeeded by: Wongsonegoro

Personal details
- Born: 4 January 1910 Magelang, Dutch East Indies
- Died: 24 July 1970 (aged 60) Banyuwangi, Indonesia
- Party: Masyumi Party
- Spouse: Rabingah (m. 1932)
- Children: 4
- Occupation: Politician

Prawoto Mangkusasmito (4 January 1910 – 24 July 1970) was an Indonesian politician who served as the final chairman of the Masyumi political party before its dissolution in 1960. He also served as the Deputy Prime Minister of Indonesia during the Wilopo Cabinet between 1952 and 1953.

He originated from a Santri family from Central Java and studied law in Batavia, although the Japanese occupation began before he completed his studies. Joining Masyumi after Indonesian independence, he became a prominent member of parliament and along with Wilopo of the Indonesian National Party formed the Wilopo Cabinet. Due to other Masyumi leaders' involvement in the Revolutionary Government of the Republic of Indonesia, Prawoto took over its leadership in 1959, unsuccessfully attempting to recover the party's political position before its dissolution in 1960. Continuing to criticize Sukarno's Guided Democracy, he was arrested in 1962. Following his release in 1966, his attempts to reenter politics did not bear fruit and he died in 1970.

== Early life and education ==
Prawoto was born in the village of Tirto, today in Magelang Regency of Central Java, on 4 January 1910. His father, Mangkusasmito, was the local village chief and a Santri. He enrolled at a Hollandsch-Inlandsche School in 1917, becoming friends with later foreign minister Mohammad Roem, before continuing his studies to a Meer Uitgebreid Lager Onderwijs in Magelang and then an Algemene Middelbare School in Yogyakarta. In Yogyakarta, he became exposed to the growing Indonesian nationalist movement and he joined the Jong Java youth organization.

After graduating from AMS, Prawoto moved to Batavia in 1935 and studied at the Batavia Law Institute (Rechtshogeschool te Batavia). While a student there, he also taught at a local school and became a leading member of the Studenten Islam Studie-Club (Islamic Students' Study Club). Before completing his studies, he had joined Soekiman Wirjosandjojo's Indonesian Islamic Party. When the Japanese took over the country in 1942, due to his organizational activities, Prawoto had not completed his degree. During the Japanese occupation period, Prawoto with other Islamic politicians such as Roem and Jusuf Wibisono formed the Islamic militia "Hizbullah".

== Career ==
Following the proclamation of Indonesian independence and the formation of political parties, Prawoto joined the Masyumi party and became a member of its leadership committee as a representative of Muhammadiyah. He became a member of the Central Indonesian National Committee and was appointed to its Working Body. After the conclusion of the Indonesian National Revolution and the dissolution of the United States of Indonesia, he became a member of the Provisional People's Representative Council.

In 1952, following the collapse of the Sukiman Cabinet, Prawoto was appointed by President Sukarno alongside the Indonesian National Party (PNI)'s Sidik Djojosukarto to form a parliament. Due to political friction between Prawoto and PNI, however, no cabinets were formed by the pair – ministerial appointments were a matter of dispute between the two parties. After the two submitted their mandates, Sukarno reappointed Prawoto as formateur, but replaced Djojosukarto with Wilopo. Wilopo was more willing to compromise with Masyumi on ministerial posts, and the pair successfully formed a government, the Wilopo Cabinet, on 3 April 1952. Within this cabinet, Prawoto served as Deputy Prime Minister. Within Masyumi, he was first elected general secretary in 1954 and then deputy chairman in 1956. He was reelected into the parliament following the 1955 legislative election. He also became a member of the Constitutional Assembly of Indonesia, serving as its deputy chairman.

Several important Masyumi leaders such as Mohammad Natsir, Burhanuddin Harahap, and Sjafruddin Prawiranegara left Jakarta for Sumatra in late 1957, and in early 1958 the remainder of the party was in crisis due to their involvement within the emerging Revolutionary Government of the Republic of Indonesia (PRRI). Prawoto along with Fakih Usman and Mohammad Roem unsuccessfully attempted to negotiate with the Masyumi leaders in Sumatra. Upon PRRI's declaration in February 1958, Prawoto was appointed as Masyumi's interim president to take Natsir's place, and after internal debate, the party opted to issue a soft condemnation of their leaders' actions in PRRI. As the movement continued, internal disputes within the party remained while Prawoto attempted to form a united front with other Islamic parties such as Nahdlatul Ulama and the Indonesian Islamic Union Party. His opposition, led by former prime minister Soekiman Wirjosandjojo, favored forming an anti-communist front with PNI and other nationalist parties. In Masyumi's April 1959 congress, Prawoto's faction emerged victorious, and he was elected Masyumi's chairman.

Despite this, Masyumi's position as a political party continued to deteriorate. Prawoto conducted negotiations with PNI to secure Masyumi's political future and made some headway, but this fell apart following Sukarno's 1959 Decree which dissolved the Constitutional Assembly. Throughout 1959 and early 1960, Sukarno further centralized power, issuing a decree that allowed the government to dissolve political parties in December 1959 and disbanding the parliament elected in 1955 in March 1960. Within 1960, Prawoto continued to criticize the new Guided Democracy system, until Masyumi was ordered to be dissolved by Sukarno on 17 August 1960 through a presidential decree and the party's leadership opted to dissolve the party voluntarily in September. Prawoto was arrested in 1962, having called for Sukarno to be tried for violating the constitution. He was imprisoned in Madiun and following the fall of Sukarno he was released on 17 May 1966.

== Later life and death ==
After Prawoto's release, he attempted to reestablish Masyumi along with its other former leaders, but his efforts failed. He was also active in Islamic dawah along with Mohammad Natsir. During one speaking trip to the rural regions of Banyuwangi, Prawoto died unexpectedly near midnight on 24 July 1970. He was initially buried at a public cemetery in South Jakarta before his grave was relocated to Kalibata Heroes' Cemetery in the 1990s.

== Personal life ==
Prawoto married Rabingah on 20 October 1932, and the couple had four children.
