= Commission of Four =

Indonesian anti-corruption commission

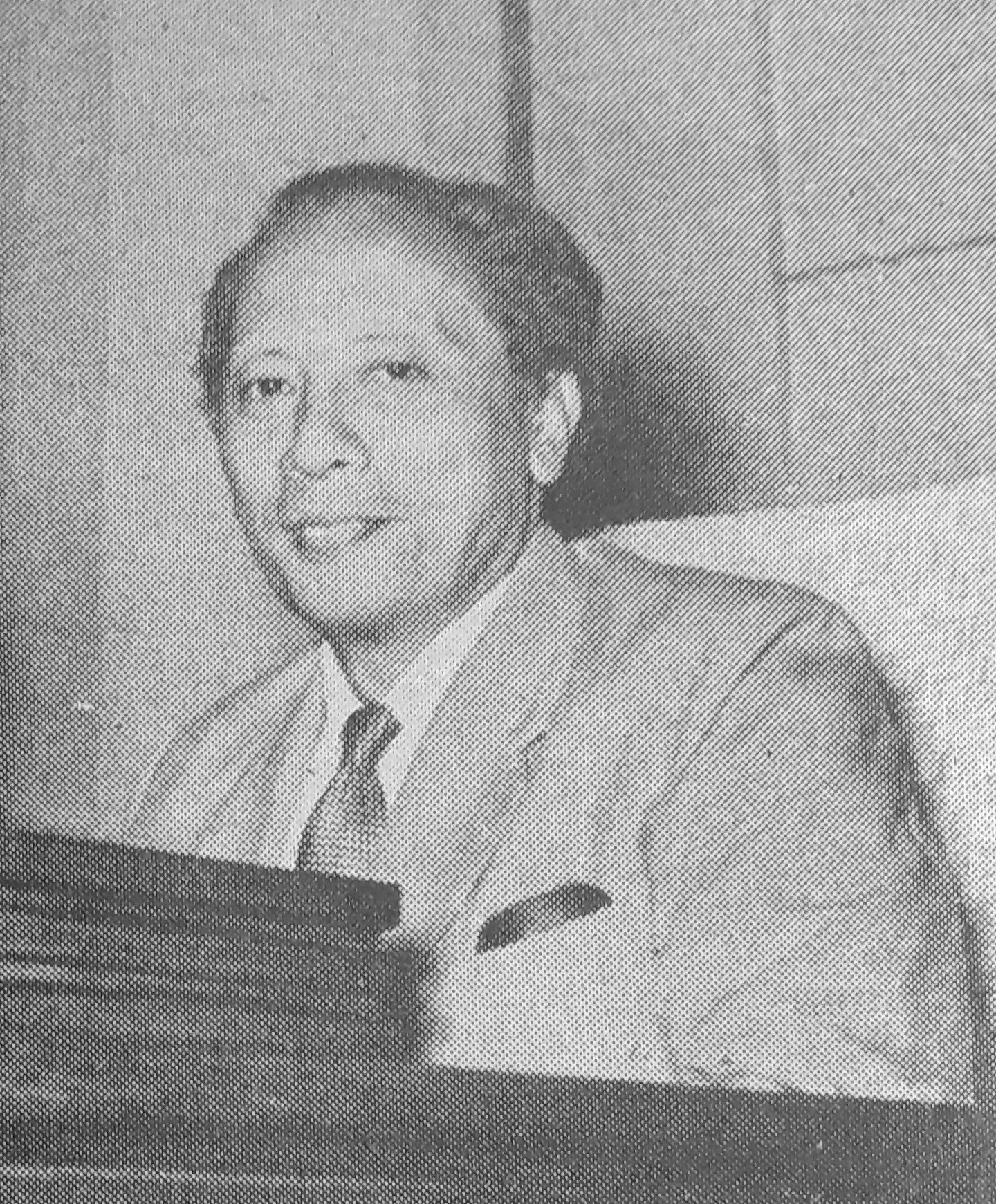
Former Prime Minister Wilopo (1909–1981), who was then serving as chairman of the Supreme Advisory Council, was chairman of the commission

The Commission of Four (Indonesian: Komisi Empat or Komisi IV) was an Indonesian anti-corruption commission which existed from January to July 1970. Created by President Suharto following student protests, it was tasked with reviewing policies and providing recommendations to the government. The commission consisted of four members — Wilopo (who concurrently served as chairman), I. J. Kasimo, Herman Johannes, and Anwar Tjokroaminoto — as well as a secretary and an advisor, namely Sutopo Juwono and Mohammad Hatta respectively.

Among the cases it investigated, the commission highlighted the case of Pertamina, the state-owned oil company, and its head, Ibnu Sutowo, along with other state-owned companies such as that of Telkom. After six months of work, the Commission of Four submitted its report and was dissolved by Suharto. However, the commission's report was leaked to Sinar Harapan a few days after it was submitted. Input from the commission was not taken seriously, resulting in the bankruptcy of Pertamina in the mid-1970s due to corruption and mismanagement.

== See also ==
- Corruption Eradication Commission
