= Tanjung Morawa affair =

1953 clash in Indonesia

- Part of the liberal democracy period in Indonesia
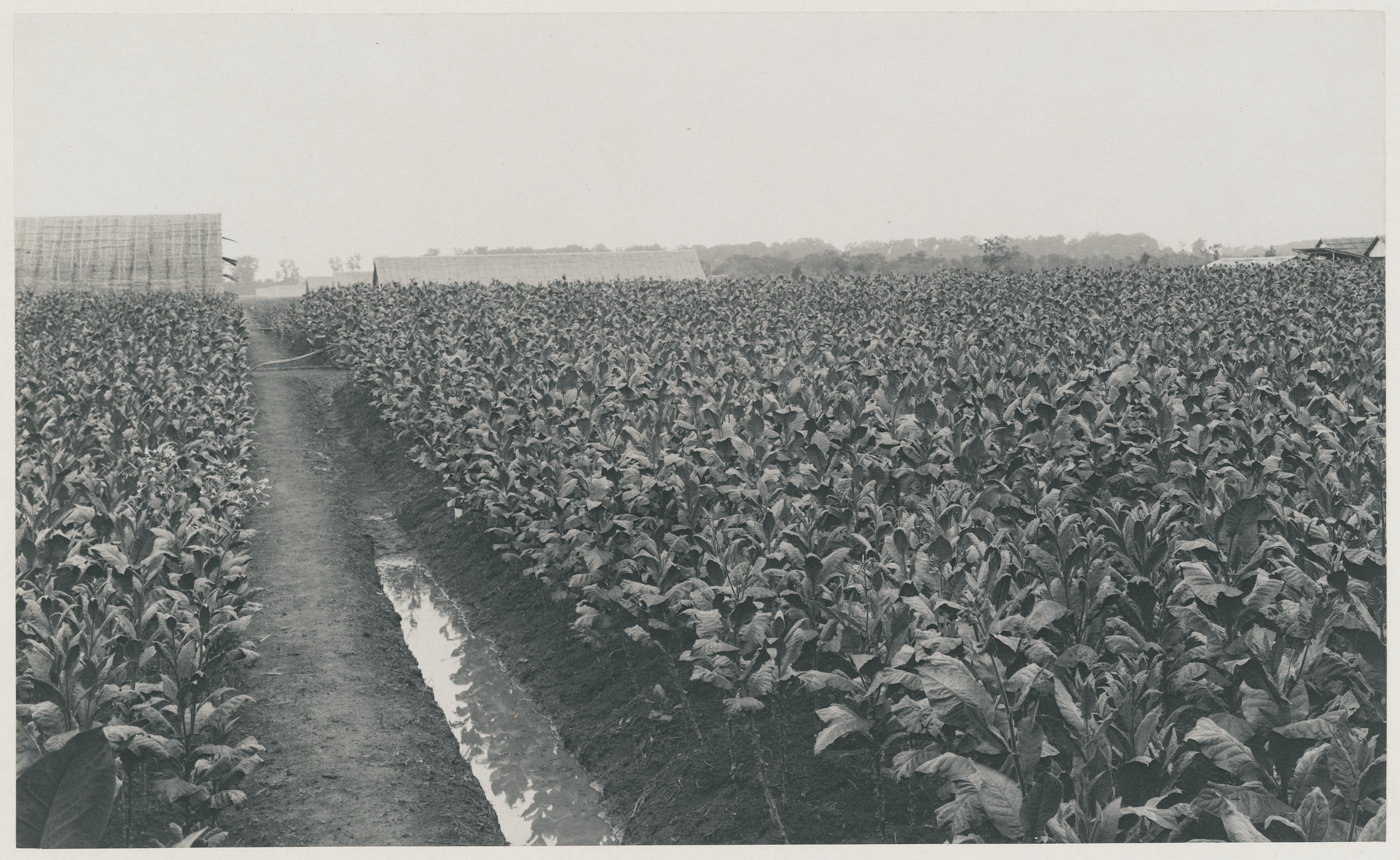
- A tobacco plantation in North Sumatra
- Date: 16 March 1953
- Location: Tanjung Morawa, North Sumatra
- Caused by: Land dispute between peasant squatters and foreign plantation owners; Attempted eviction of peasant squatters by the government of Indonesia
- Result: Establishment of several inquiry committees both by parliament and particular parties; Motion of no confidence issued against Prime Minister Wilopo and his cabinet

Parties
Government of Indonesia: Indonesian National Police	Peasant squatters

Lead figures
Wilopo; Prime Minister of Indonesia; Mohammad Roem; Minister of Home Affairs; Abdul Hakim; Governor of North Sumatra	Non-centralized leadership

Casualties
- Deaths: 5
- Injuries: c. 20

The Tanjung Morawa affair (Indonesian: Peristiwa Tanjung Morawa, lit. 'Tanjung Morawa event') was a clash between peasant squatters and the police which occurred on 16 March 1953 in Tanjung Morawa, North Sumatra. The incident, which stemmed from a land dispute between the squatters and foreign plantation owners, resulted in the death of five peasants and the downfall of Prime Minister Wilopo and his cabinet.

== Background ==
Under colonial rule, the lowland area around the city of Medan emerged as a major producer of tobacco, with large plantation estates forming soon after the government controls of the Cultivation System were lifted. During the Japanese occupation and subsequent struggle for independence, the land on which these plantations sat on was taken over by indigenous and local Chinese squatters, mostly former estate workers and villagers from the surrounding areas. By early 1953, there were an estimated 62,000 families squatting on the tobacco estates. Meanwhile, the foreign owners of these plantations still retained their legal claims to them. Following the Dutch-Indonesian Round Table Conference (KMB) in 1949, which recognized the sovereignty of Indonesia, the Indonesian government sought to return these plantations to their foreign owners, both to abide by the KMB agreement and to attract foreign investment.

== The affair ==
In 1951, Iskaq Tjokrohadisurjo, the Minister of Home Affairs, had managed a compromise with the Deli Planters Association (DPV), a large union of tobacco planters. The government would nationalize 130,000 of the 255,000 hectares of land owned by the DPV. In exchange, the DPV would receive a new 30-year lease of the remaining 125,000 hectares. The government would then resettle the peasants which squatted in the leased land elsewhere. Before the agreement was implemented, however, a new cabinet, led by Wilopo, took office in 1952. Subsequently, the new cabinet attempted to enforce the agreement and conducted negotiations with the squatters. The negotiations failed to produce a solution and the government opted to remove the peasants by force. On 16 March 1953, police officers plowed up the land with tractors to force the squatters to leave, resulting in a clash that killed five peasants and injured around 20 more.

== Reactions ==
Outrage over the incident led to the establishment of several committees of inquiry, both by parliament and particular parties. The local branch of the Indonesian National Party (PNI), which supported the squatters, subsequently pressured the PNI leadership council to withdraw its support of the cabinet lest they would secede from the party. On 2 June, the cabinet decided to dissolve itself, being replaced by a new cabinet led by Prime Minister Ali Sastroamidjojo.
