= Soekiman Wirjosandjojo =

Indonesian politician and physician (1898–1974)

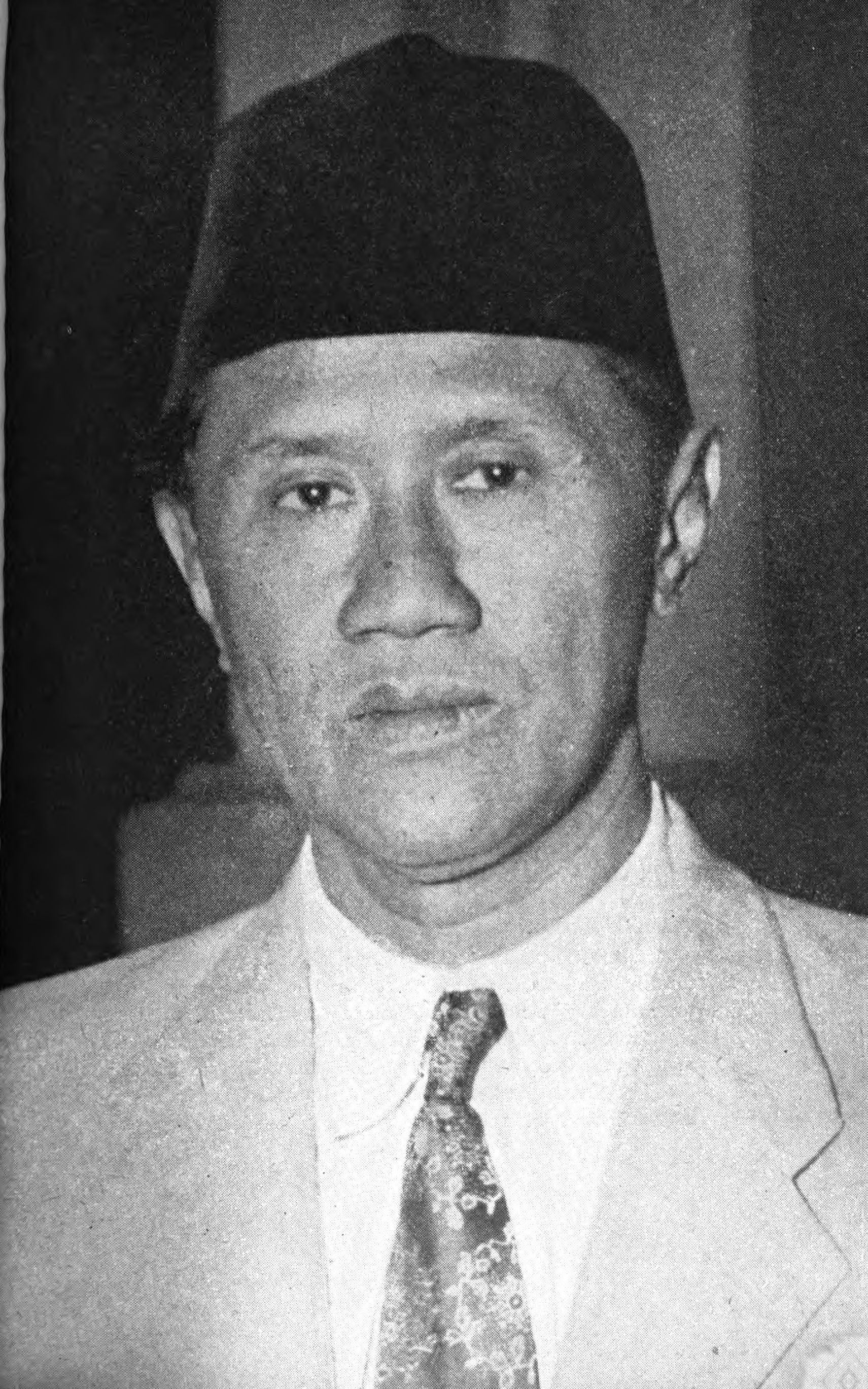
- Portrait, c. 1952

6th Prime Minister of Indonesia
- In office 27 April 1951 – 3 April 1952
- President: Sukarno
- Deputy: Suwiryo
- Preceded by: Mohammad Natsir
- Succeeded by: Wilopo

Minister of Health
- Acting
- In office 31 March 1949 – 13 July 1949
- Preceded by: Mananti Sitompul
- Succeeded by: Surono

4th Minister of Home Affairs
- In office 31 March 1949 – 13 July 1949
- Preceded by: Teuku Muhammad Hasan
- Succeeded by: Wongsonegoro
- In office 29 January 1948 – 4 August 1948
- Prime Minister: Mohammad Hatta
- Preceded by: Mohammad Roem
- Succeeded by: Teuku Muhammad Hasan
Legislative offices
Member of the House of Representatives
In office 15 February 1950 – 1960
Constituency	Central Java (1956–1959)
Member of the Central Indonesian National Committee
In office 29 August 1945 – 15 December 1949

Personal details
- Born: 19 June 1898 Soerakarta, Dutch East Indies
- Died: 23 July 1974 (aged 76) Yogyakarta, Indonesia
- Resting place: Taman Siswa
- Party: Masyumi (1945–1960)
- Other political affiliations: PSII (1927–1933); PII (1938–1942)
- Spouse: Kustami (m. 1923)
- Education: Amsterdam University
- Occupation: Politician; physician

Soekiman Wirjosandjojo (EYD: Sukiman Wiryosanjoyo; 19 June 1898 – 23 July 1974) was an Indonesian politician and physician who served as prime minister of Indonesia from 1951 until 1952. Additionally, Soekiman served as the first president of the Masyumi Party from 1945 to 1951.

Born into a merchant family in Surakarta, Soekiman was educated as a physician at Batavia's STOVIA medical school and Amsterdam University. Having served as chairman of the Perhimpoenan Indonesia association while in the Netherlands, he returned to Java and began participating in politics while working as a doctor. He was active within the Islamic political organization Sarekat Islam, later the Indonesian Islamic Union Party, from which he was expelled in 1933 due to a dispute. He then co-founded the Indonesian Islamic Political Party (Partii), which in 1938 became the Indonesian Islamic Party. (PII). During the Japanese occupation of the Dutch East Indies, he was active within the Pusat Tenaga Rakyat propaganda organization, and in 1945 was appointed a member of the Investigating Committee for Preparatory Work for Independence.

When Masyumi was formed as a political party in November 1945, Soekiman was elected its first chairman. He acted as opposition to various government cabinets during the Indonesian National Revolution, namely those of Prime Ministers Sutan Sjahrir and Amir Sjarifuddin, although he agreed to work with them following the Dutch military offensive of 1947. He was later appointed as Minister of Home Affairs under Mohammad Hatta's cabinet and became part of the Indonesian delegation in the Dutch–Indonesian Round Table Conference. In independent Indonesia, Soekiman was first replaced as Masyumi's chairman by Mohammad Natsir, and in turn, he replaced Natsir as prime minister in April 1951 by forming a coalition with the Indonesian National Party, creating the Soekiman Cabinet.

As prime minister, Soekiman nationalized Bank Indonesia and initiated a holiday bonus program for civil servants. He also arrested thousands of individuals due to a suspected coup attempt, particularly members of the Indonesian Communist Party. In foreign policy, Soekiman's tenure saw an improvement in relations with the Western Bloc and especially with the United States. However, there remained an internal dispute within Masyumi between Soekiman and Natsir, and this coupled with secretive negotiations between foreign minister Achmad Soebardjo and United States ambassador H. Merle Cochran led to the collapse of Soekiman's cabinet. He remained active within Masyumi after his premiership, until he departed from politics following the involvement of Masyumi leaders in the Revolutionary Government of the Republic of Indonesia and the advent of Guided Democracy. He died in Yogyakarta in 1974.

== Early life ==
Soekiman was born in Sewu, today in Surakarta, on 19 June 1898. (Note: According to an official biography published in 1982. A separate government-published biodata from 1952 mentions 19 June 1896.) He was the youngest of four children. Soekiman's father, Wirjosandjojo, was a rice merchant. Wirjosandjojo had a business relationship with a Dutch armed forces veteran, and through his help Soekiman could enroll at a Europeesche Lagere School (ELS) in Boyolali, normally reserved for Europeans and native nobility. After completing ELS and later he continued his education at the medical school STOVIA in Batavia. During his time at STOVIA, Soekiman had been active within Jong Java, which was founded by his older brother Satiman Wirjosandjojo.

Graduating from STOVIA in 1923, he considered working for the colonial train company, but his father convinced him to continue his medical school at Amsterdam University and provided financial support. Also in 1923, Soekiman married Kustami, and the two had a son before Soekiman departed for the Netherlands. In Amsterdam, he studied internal medicine. He was active in the Indonesian students' organization Indonesische Vereniging during his foreign studies, serving as the organization's chairman between 1924 and 1925. Under Soekiman, the Vereniging translated its official name to Perhimpoenan Indonesia, and also renamed its magazine from Hindia Poetra ("Son of the Indies") to Indonesia Merdeka ("Independent Indonesia").

== Early career ==
Returning from the Netherlands, Soekiman moved to Yogyakarta and initially worked in a hospital run by Muhammadiyah. After two years, he left the hospital and opened a private practice in Bintaran. He was known for his skills in treating lung illnesses and would often give discounts or free treatments for poorer patients.

In 1927, Soekiman joined the Partai Sarekat Islam (PSI). Along with Sukarno, Soekiman co-founded the Association of Political Organisations of the Indonesian People (PPPKI) in an attempt to unite and coordinate the various Indonesian nationalistic political parties and organizations. However, tensions quickly emerged between PSI and other PPPKI members, as PSI was seen as putting Islam above Indonesian nationalism (Note: At the time, PSI accepted non-Indonesian Muslims as members.) to the point where many PPPKI members called for PSI to be expelled from the organization, despite PSI's renaming to Partai Sarekat Islam Indonesia (PSII) in January 1930. In response to the calls, Soekiman called PPPKI an "imperialistic" organization at PSII's 1931 congress. Despite the public disagreements, Soekiman maintained a good personal relationship with secular nationalistic figures such as Mohammad Hatta. When Soekiman launched the nationalist Utusan Indonesia newspaper in 1932, he asked Hatta to become its chief editor.

Soekiman attempted to defend the rights of around 900 PSII members laid off by a colonial government-owned pawnbroking network and succeeded in lobbying for severance pay and secured priority for the employees to be rehired. However, he did not consult PSII's senior leaders such as H.O.S. Tjokroaminoto and Agus Salim before his efforts. This was used as the reason for his expulsion from the party in March 1933. Soekiman had longstanding disagreements with PSII's noncooperative stance with the colonial government, and after he was expelled he formed the Partij Politiek Islam Indonesia (PARTII) with Muhammadiyah's support. PARTII failed to garner popular support, however, and was disbanded before long. Following Tjokroaminoto's death, Soekiman briefly rejoined PSII in 1937, before leaving in 1938 and founding another political party, the Indonesian Islamic Party (PII). He took part in the founding of Majelis Islam A'la Indonesia (Indonesian Islamic Assembly, MIAI) which was intended to serve as a federation of various Islamic organizations. Along with his brother Satiman, Soekiman also initiated the formation of an Islamic higher education institute, establishing several pilot projects in 1939 and 1940 before the Japanese invasion of the Dutch East Indies interrupted their growth.

== Japanese occupation ==
Early on in the occupation, Soekiman became inactive in politics due to a ban on various political organizations including MIAI. Once MIAI was allowed to operate again in September 1942, Soekiman became one of its leaders along with Harsono Tjokroaminoto and Wondoamiseno, until it was once again shut down in late 1943. Aside from MIAI, he was also active within the propaganda organization Pusat Tenaga Rakyat as an appointed member.

Soekiman was later also listed as a member of the Investigating Committee for Preparatory Work for Independence (BPUPK). After the committee had drafted the Jakarta Charter, Soekiman supported Wahid Hasyim's proposal to formally establish Islam as a state religion, and require that any future elected presidents and vice presidents be Muslim. Initially, other committee members from nationalist and secular parties agreed to Hasyim's proposal. However, before the proposal could be formalized, the Japanese reformed BPUPK into the smaller Preparatory Committee for Indonesian Independence (PPKI). Soekiman did not become a member of this committee, and PPKI members cancelled Hasyim's proposal, allowing non-Muslims to serve as president and establishing Indonesia's lack of a formal state religion. Beyond this matter, Soekiman also discussed the legal structures of the future People's Consultative Assembly and the legal rights of citizens within the Constitution of Indonesia.

== Indonesian revolution ==
Following the proclamation of Indonesian independence on 17 August 1945, Soekiman 22 August was appointed as one of the members of the leadership committee of the Indonesian National Party (PNI), at that time the only permitted political party under the new government. This was not to last, as on 3 November the government issued a declaration calling for the formation of other political parties. Just days later, the Indonesian Muslim Congress was held in Yogyakarta on 7 November, and the Masyumi Party was founded with Soekiman elected its first chairman. Aside from Soekiman, former members of PII dominated Masyumi's first leadership committee. Despite this, however, Soekiman in a speech concluding the congress lambasted the government's decision to allow the formation of more political parties, claiming that such a move would divide the nation.

Soekiman was opposed to the formation of Sutan Sjahrir's first cabinet, which he considered to be a constitutional violation. Masyumi had declared in its founding congress that it was opposed to the emerging parliamentary system of government, as the constitution approved less than a year prior had mandated a presidential system for Indonesia. Along with Tan Malaka's Persatuan Perjuangan (PP) organization, Masyumi placed itself in opposition to Sjahrir's government until March 1946, when several PP members were arrested. Following the arrests, Masyumi's hostility to the government softened. Soekiman still criticized the formation of the Second Sjahrir Cabinet in February 1946, despite having been involved in determining its composition. On 3 July 1946, Soekiman visited the presidential palace, apparently believing that President Sukarno was to make an announcement. Once he spoke with Vice President Mohammad Hatta, however, he was informed that there was an attempted coup against Sjahrir's cabinet by Mohammad Yamin and several military officers. Upon learning of the fact, he left the palace immediately, with the coup failing and its plotters arrested.

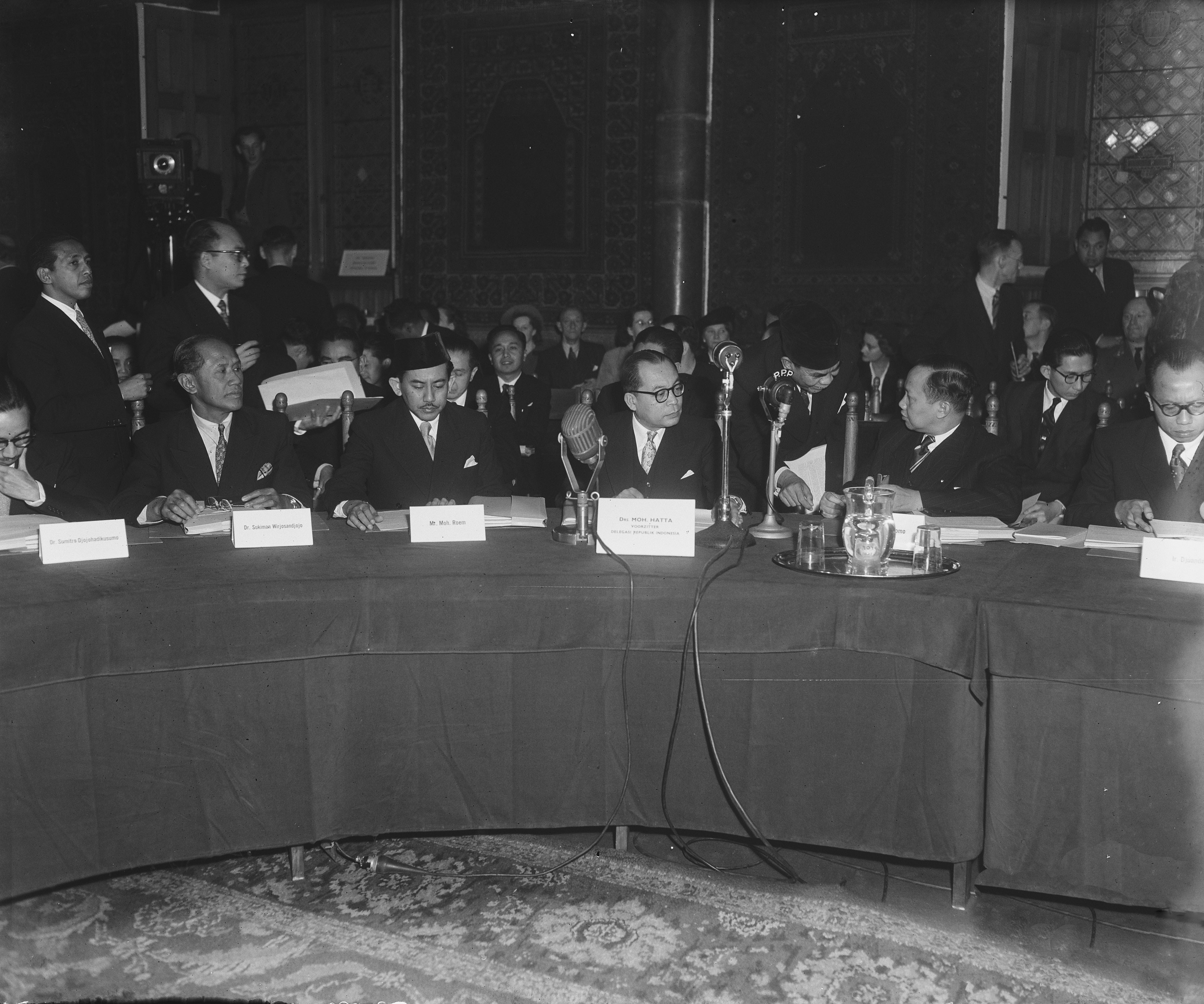
Soekiman (second from left) as part of the Indonesian delegation during the Dutch-Indonesian Round Table Conference.

Increased Dutch military activity starting from the end of 1946 forced Sjahrir into the negotiating table, and the Linggadjati Agreement was signed on 15 November 1946. Soekiman's Masyumi opposed the agreement, seeing it as too accommodating to Dutch demands, to the point where Soekiman declared his intention to overthrow Sjahrir's government by force. After the collapse of Sjahrir's third cabinet on 27 June 1947, Soekiman was appointed by Sukarno as one of four formateurs (along with Amir Sjarifuddin, Adnan Kapau Gani, and Setyadjit Soegondo) to form a new government. Soekiman, believing that Masyumi had significant popular backing, demanded several important posts be held by Masyumi members. The other three formateurs rejected his demands, and Sukarno decided to revoke Soekiman's mandate as formateur. The remaining three formateurs organized the First Amir Sjarifuddin Cabinet. Sjarifuddin was generally hostile towards Masyumi, and thus he appointed ministers such as Wondoamiseno and Arudji Kartawinata originating from the Masyumi splinter party PSII.

The hostility between Sjarifuddin and Soekiman continued until the Dutch Operation Product in July 1947, which forced both parties to compromise and Sjarifuddin agreed to appoint several Masyumi members into his cabinet. Regardless, his cabinet collapsed following Masyumi's loss of support later on following the Renville Agreement, and Soekiman was appointed Interior Minister within the succeeding First Hatta Cabinet. Soekiman's appointment was well-received by Islamic organizations, and the Dutch even mistook Soekiman as the leader of the emerging Darul Islam movement. Soekiman later took part in the Indonesian delegation for the negotiations regarding the transfer of sovereignty in 1949.

== Premiership ==
=== Cabinet formation ===
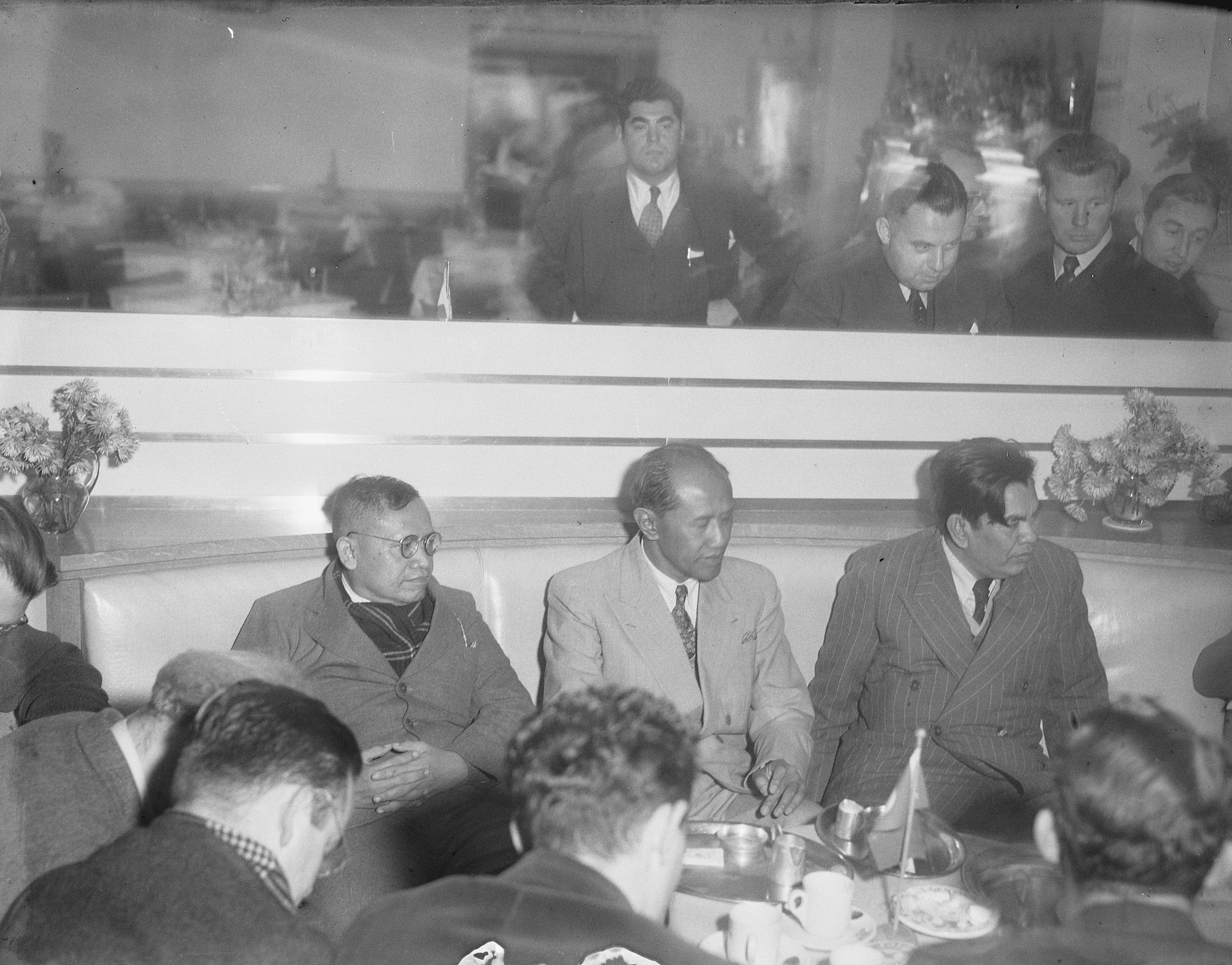
Soekiman (seated, center) as part of Indonesia's Western New Guinea delegation in 1950.

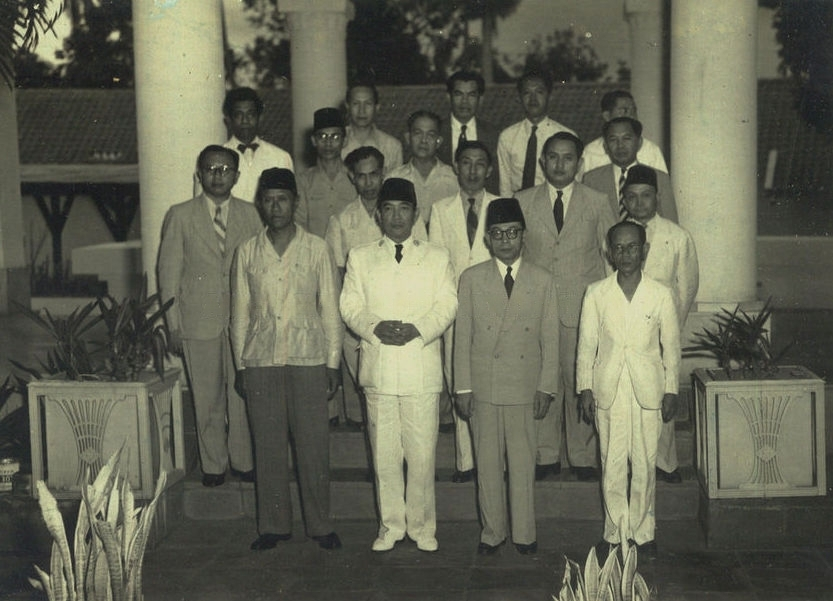
Soekiman (bottom row, first from left) with Sukarno, Hatta, and his cabinet.

Soekiman led Masyumi until 1949 when Mohammad Natsir was appointed chair of the party's executive committee to replace him. Soekiman held on to the position of party chairman, however, until he was demoted to deputy chairman in 1951. When Natsir became prime minister in 1950, Soekiman became a critic of his cabinet, judging that it was formed with too much pressure from the Indonesian Army. Soekiman also disagreed with Natsir's decision to exclude the PNI from the government, which he believed would result in the government becoming vulnerable. Natsir's cabinet indeed faced such instability in early 1951 due to pressure both from the PNI-led opposition and from Soekiman's supporters within the party. Natsir attempted to form a compromise with PNI, but the cabinet collapsed on 21 March 1951 when one of its coalition members the Great Indonesia Party withdrew from government. During Natsir's premiership, Soekiman was also briefly sent abroad as part of a delegation discussing the Western New Guinea dispute, but the delegation was told to return home after less than a month.

Initially, PNI's Sartono was tasked and failed to form a replacement cabinet. In his place, Soekiman along with PNI's Sidik Djojosukarto were appointed formateurs. Following negotiations, Soekiman struck a deal with PNI regarding power sharing within the government, with PNI agreeing to Soekiman becoming prime minister. However, PNI wished for Natsir to lose his influence within the government. This deal resulted in Masyumi's internal split worsening, to the point where the party's executive committee issued a declaration stating that Soekiman's actions did not represent the party. Regardless, a government was formed and Soekiman began serving as prime minister with PNI's Suwiryo as his deputy on 27 April 1951. The cabinet included five Masyumi members, but none were part of Natsir's faction within the party. Despite proposals during Natsir's premiership to reduce the number of cabinet positions, Soekiman instead increased it and received criticism for it. Eventually, however, Natsir's faction relented and issued another statement supporting the Soekiman government, allowing it to function politically. Unlike Natsir's slim majority, the government held a significant majority in parliament hence providing Soekiman with plenty of political capital in policymaking. Also unlike Natsir, Soekiman maintained a close personal relationship with Sukarno.

=== Domestic policy ===
Soekiman's government took a harder stance against the emerging Darul Islam movement under Kartosoewirjo compared to the preceding government. In January 1951, Soekiman approved a military operation against the movement after Natsir's amnesty program was deemed to be unsuccessful.

During Soekiman's premiership, the former colonial central bank (De Javasche Bank) was nationalized under Finance Minister Jusuf Wibisono through a share purchase, creating the new national central bank Bank Indonesia. Aside from the bank, the government also agreed to partially nationalize a 255,000-hectare tobacco plantation in Tanjung Morawa, North Sumatra, although its implementation would be left to the next cabinet, which failed to implement it.

Due to increased exports of raw materials, the government budget in 1951 experienced a surplus. Soekiman's government began implementing economist Sumitro Djojohadikusumo's plan for national industrialization and pressed on despite more vulnerable government finances due to declining exports in later months. Initially, the government implemented a foreign exchange certificate system but revoked it in February 1952 following former German finance minister Hjalmar Schacht's advice and put a 33 percent export tax in its place. The government promoted trade with the United States, Canada, and Japan, while trade with the Netherlands generally declined.

In 1951, Soekiman decided to grant civil servants a bonus during the month of Ramadan. The bonus is considered the predecessor of the modern Tunjangan Hari Raya (Holiday Allowance) in Indonesia, and at the time amounted to between 125 and 200 rupiah plus some rice. As the bonus was limited to government employees, private employees went on strike on 13 February 1952 to receive similar benefits. Before the strike itself, several labor actions had been held, and in August 1951 a rumour circulated that a foreign entity was planning to launch a coup with the support of the Indonesian Communist Party (PKI). Following a shooting at Tanjung Priok on 5 August 1951, he directed the government to carry out mass arrests, detaining members of the PKI and other left-wing parties without charge for months. According to Soekiman in a 29 October statement, the arrests involved 15,000 people. The legislature initially did not oppose this action. However, as it became clear that the arrests had been planned by Soekiman by just involving a handful of others, and that no coup had been planned, Soekiman was accused of acting in panic or under pressure from the United States. Despite this, the government coalition remained solid, and the PKI was weakened by the sweeps.

=== Foreign policy ===
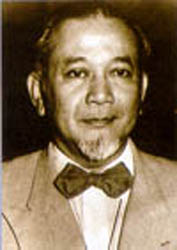
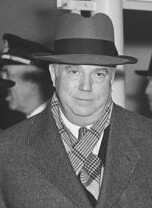
Secretive negotiations between Soebardjo (left) and Cochran (right) led to Soekiman's downfall as prime minister.

Relationship with the People's Republic of China (PRC) deteriorated during Soekiman's tenure, as he believed that PKI was being supported and funded by the PRC. Soekiman's cabinet implemented an international trade embargo against the PRC and denied entry to a number of its diplomats. Conversely, Soekiman's foreign policy tended to favor Western countries, especially the United States. Soekiman sent foreign minister Achmad Soebardjo to sign the Treaty of San Francisco in 1951, despite internal opposition to the act by some Masyumi leaders such as Mohammad Roem and Sjafruddin Prawiranegara. Regardless, Soebardjo signed the agreement on 6 September 1951. While in the United States, Soebardjo also negotiated with the US Secretary of State Dean Acheson, lobbying Acheson to provide loans and aid to Indonesia under the Mutual Security Act (MSA).

In January 1952, Soebardjo resumed negotiations regarding MSA loans and aid with US Ambassador to Indonesia H. Merle Cochran, with Soekiman's knowledge. Once this was made known to the parliament and the general public, opposition emerged as the negotiations were perceived to pull Indonesia towards the Western Bloc in the Cold War, contrary to the nation's "free and active" foreign policy doctrine. This opposition was strengthened by the secretive nature of Soebardjo and Cochran's negotiations. On 12 February 1952, the Masyumi leadership council issued a statement opposing any agreement with Cochran, followed by a similar statement by PNI four days later. This led to Soebardjo's resignation as foreign minister on 21 February and of Soekiman's along with the rest of his cabinet on 23 February. Wilopo replaced Soekiman as prime minister on 1 April.

== Later career ==
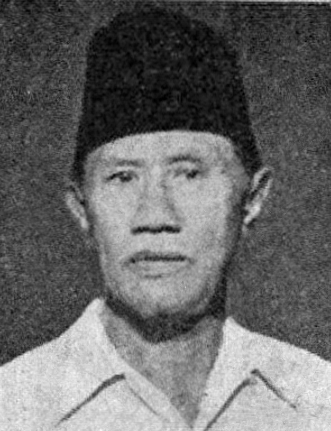
Official portrait of Soekiman, c. 1956.

After his resignation as prime minister, Soekiman was appointed as chair of Masyumi's electoral committee, tasked with devising Masyumi's strategy in facing the 1955 Indonesian legislative election. Soekiman was once more appointed as cabinet formateur on 29 July 1955 after the collapse of the First Ali Sastroamidjojo Cabinet, this time with PNI's Wilopo and Masyumi's Assaat, but the trio failed to form a cabinet, and their mandate was returned by 3 August. He also became a member of the Constitutional Assembly of Indonesia.

In 1958, Natsir along with several other Masyumi leaders joined the seditious Revolutionary Government of the Republic of Indonesia (PRRI), triggering an internal split within the remaining leaders of the party. Soekiman attempted to lobby other Masyumi leaders into condemning Natsir's actions, but pro-Natsir politicians such as Prawoto Mangkusasmito blocked his attempt and thus the party limited its public statements against Natsir, simply referring to the PRRI movement as unconstitutional. Prawoto's faction took over the party's leadership following the 1959 Masyumi Congress, leaving just Soekiman holding his post as deputy chairman. In 1960, Soekiman was invited to join the newly formed People's Representative Council of Mutual Assistance by Sukarno. However, he publicly rejected this invitation, likely displeasing Sukarno as the two never met face to face-afterward. Soekiman decided to retire from politics, allowing him to evade widespread arrests of former Masyumi leaders during the early 1960s as the government saw him as a non-threat. He floated the idea of forming a new Islamic party after Suharto became president but shelved his plans after consulting with authorities within the New Order.

== Death ==
Soekiman died at around 11:30 AM on 23 July 1974 in his home in Yogyakarta. Following his request to be buried near Ki Hadjar Dewantara, Soekiman was interred the following day in the Taman Siswa cemetery in Yogyakarta. He had three sons and a daughter.

== Notes ==
Political offices
Preceded by Mohammad Natsir	Prime Minister of Indonesia; 27 April 1951 – 3 April 1952	Succeeded by Wilopo
