= Wilopo =

Indonesian statesman and lawyer (1909–1981)

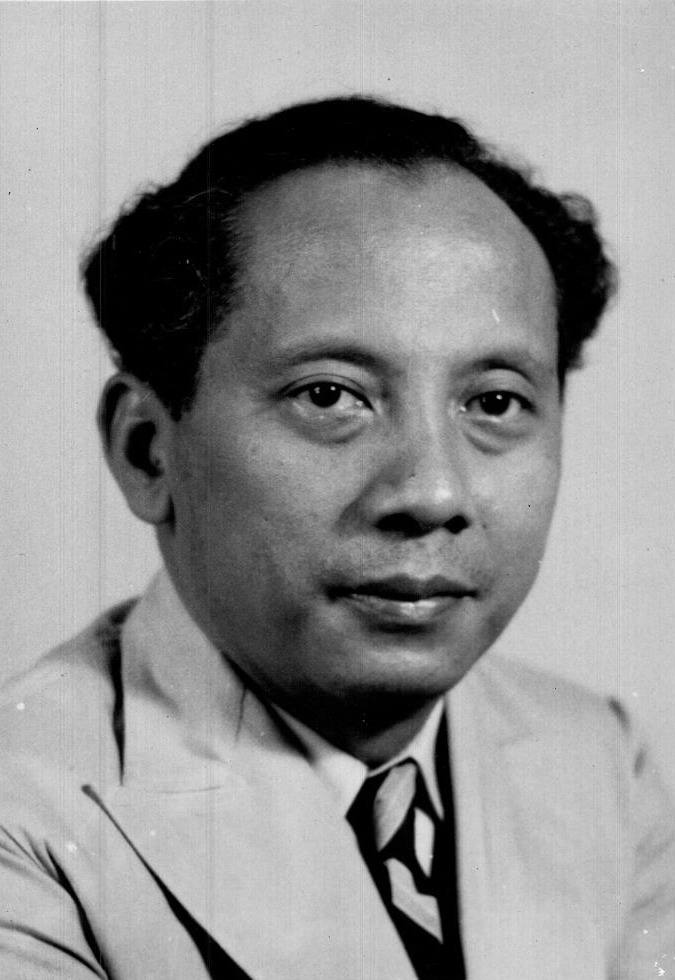
- Portrait, c. 1950s

Prime Minister of Indonesia
- In office 3 April 1952 – 1 August 1953
- President: Sukarno
- Deputy: Prawoto Mangkusasmito
- Preceded by: Soekiman Wirjosandjojo
- Succeeded by: Ali Sastroamidjojo

Speaker of the Constitutional Assembly
- In office 20 November 1956 – 5 July 1959
- Preceded by: Office established
- Succeeded by: Office abolished

Chair of the Supreme Advisory Council
- In office 4 March 1968 – 31 March 1978
- President: Suharto
- Preceded by: Muhammad Dahlan
- Succeeded by: Idham Chalid
Ministerial offices
Minister of Defense
In office 2 June 1953 – 30 July 1953
Prime Minister	Himself
Preceded by	Hamengkubuwono IX
Succeeded by	Iwa Kusumasumantri
Minister of Foreign Affairs
Acting; 3 April 1952 – 29 April 1952
Prime Minister	Himself
Preceded by	Achmad Soebardjo
Succeeded by	Mukarto Notowidigdo
Minister of Economic Affairs
In office 19 July 1951 – 3 April 1952
Prime Minister	Soekiman Wirjosandjojo
Preceded by	Sujono Hadinoto
Succeeded by	Soemanang Soerjowinoto
Minister of Labour
In office 20 December 1949 – 6 September 1950
Prime Minister	Mohammad Hatta
Preceded by	Rahendra Kusnan
Succeeded by	Soeroso
Junior Minister of Labour
In office 3 July 1947 – 29 January 1948
Minister	S. K. Trimurti
Preceded by	Office established
Succeeded by	Afriansyah Noor (2022)
Legislative offices
Member of the Constitutional Assembly
In office 9 November 1956 – 5 July 1959
Constituency	Central Java
Member of the House of Representatives
In office 24 March 1956 – 1 December 1956
Succeeded by	O. Suriapranata
Constituency	Central Java

Personal details
- Born: 21 October 1909 Purworejo, Kedu, Dutch East Indies (now Indonesia)
- Died: 20 January 1981 (aged 71) Jakarta, Indonesia
- Resting place: Tanah Kusir Cemetery
- Party: PNI (1946–1973); PDI (from 1973)
- Other political affiliations: Partindo (1932–1936); Gerindo (1937–1942); Serindo (1945–1946)
- Spouse: Sumikalimah (m. 1937)
- Education: Rechts Hogeschool (Mr.)

Wilopo (21 October 1909 – 20 January 1981) was an Indonesian statesman and lawyer who served as the prime minister of Indonesia from April 1952 to August 1953. He served in various other positions during his career, including as speaker of the Constitutional Assembly from 1956 to 1959 and as chair of the Supreme Advisory Council from 1968 to 1978. Wilopo also held ministerial offices in several cabinets. Since his death, there have been proposals to name him as a national hero.

Born into a Javanese family, Wilopo studied law at the Rechts Hogeschool in Batavia (now Jakarta) and was involved in the Indonesian nationalist movement. He became an official in the Japanese occupation government during World War II. Following the proclamation of Indonesian independence in 1945, Wilopo joined the new Indonesian government, becoming secretary-general of the ministry of labour and helping re-establish the Indonesian National Party (PNI). During the Indonesian National Revolution, Wilopo was appointed junior minister of labour and was captured by the Dutch following an offensive into Indonesian territory in 1948. Upon his release, Wilopo participated in the Round Table Conference that recognised the sovereignty of Indonesia. He then served as minister of labour in the United States of Indonesia Cabinet and as minister of economic affairs in the Soekiman Cabinet.

Following a cabinet crisis, Wilopo was appointed as cabinet formateur in March 1952. He opted to form a coalition government consisting of the PNI, the Masyumi Party, and several smaller parties, resulting in the establishment of a "business cabinet" composed of Western-educated technocrats. During his premiership, Wilopo and his government was faced with a political realignment—as the Nahdlatul Ulama seceded from the Masyumi while the Indonesian Communist Party started supporting the PNI and President Sukarno—as well as a financial crisis, caused by a collapse in commodity prices following the end of the Korean War. As prime minister, Wilopo pursued a policy of austerity and import restrictions to solve the crisis. This included cuts to the military as part of a broad reorganization of the Indonesian Army. However, the reorganization was unpopular with regional officers, causing conflict between them and the central Army leadership which culminated in the 17 October affair.

The affair greatly weakened the Wilopo Cabinet, though it would lead to a renewed effort at passing an election law. However, before the bill could pass, a land dispute between squatting peasants and foreign-owned plantations in North Sumatra led to a clash that killed several peasants. Outrage over the incident brought about the resignation of the cabinet. After leaving the premiership, Wilopo became a member of the Constitutional Assembly, being elected speaker of the body in 1956. The Constitutional Assembly was unable to pass a new constitution, however, leading to the dissolution of the body—and the return of the 1945 Constitution—by presidential decree in 1959. Afterwards, Wilopo left public office, though he would remain active within the PNI. Following the turmoil of the mid-1960s, he was appointed to the Supreme Advisory Council by President Suharto in 1968, becoming chairman of the council until 1978. He would also serve as head of an anti-corruption commission in 1970. Wilopo died in Jakarta in 1981.

== Early life ==
=== Childhood ===
Wilopo was born in Purworejo, on October 21, 1909. He was born to a modest family in Central Java. His father was a man named Soedjono Soerodirjo, but he was raised by his uncle, a man known as Mantri Guru Prawirodiharjo. He wouldn't know of his real father until he reached adulthood. When he was eight years old, he and his family had to move to Loano which is five kilometers from Purworejo. They returned to Purworejo when he was in sixth grade.

=== Education ===
Wilopo attended the Holland Inlandse School (HIS). He could have continued his education at the Europese Hogere School (ELS), but he didn't because he wanted to continue his education at the Opleiding School Voor Inlandsche Ambtenaren (OSVIA). After graduating from HIS, Wilopo continued his education at the Meer Uitgebreid Lager Onderwijs (MULO) in Magelang.

After studying at MULO, Wilopo continued his education at Algemene Middelbare School (AMS), in Yogyakarta. At AMS, Wilopo took part in exact sciences and physics. He received a scholarship to make ends meet during his life in Yogyakarta. During his stay in Yogyakarta, he enjoyed reading newsletters of the De Locomotief, Darmo Kondo, and Soeara Oemoem newspapers. Through this, he found the name of Sukarno (future President of Indonesia). Wilopo also joined the Jong Java youth organization around this time.

He continued his education at the Technische Hoge School (THS) in Bandung. There, Wilopo lived in the Prawirosentiko family's house. After some illnesses, he moved to Sukabumi, living in his cousin's house. There, he became a teacher at the Taman Siswa.

He moved to Jakarta and continued his studies at the Rechts Hoge School (RHS). During this time, he lived at the house of Abdul Rasyid, a friend of his from MULO.

== Ministership ==
Wilopo's first government position was as the junior minister of labour during the First and Second Amir Sjarifuddin Cabinets from 3 July 1947 to 29 January 1948. After a brief hiatus, he became the minister of labour during the Republic of the United States of Indonesia Cabinet from 20 December 1949 to 6 September 1950. He later became the minister of trade and industry during the Sukiman Cabinet.

== Premiership ==
After completing his tenure as Minister of Trade and Industry, on 19 March 1952, Wilopo was told to choose a cabinet to lead. Three days after giving his list to President Sukarno, on 1 April he and his cabinet took power; it was essentially a coalition of necessity between the Masyumi and National parties. During his time as prime minister, he also spent 26 days as Foreign Minister, from 3 to 29 April, making him the shortest-serving Indonesian foreign minister as of 2011. As prime minister, he was initially able to draw support from the army by unhesitatingly accepting the Sultan of Yogyakarta Hamengkubuwono IX as defense minister. After fourteen months, the cabinet collapsed; the collapse was blamed on land issues.

== Later career ==
From 1956 to 1959, Wilopo served as the Speaker of the Constitutional Assembly of Indonesia. He later became head of the Commission of Four, a part of the Corruption Eradication Team, with his service beginning in June 1970. Despite finding "corruption everywhere", no actions were taken by the government.

== Death and legacy ==
Wilopo died in Jakarta in 1981. Herbert Feith, an Australian scholar on Indonesian politics, notes that Wilopo was widely considered fair-minded and sympathetic to the plight of the working classes, working carefully towards his goals. As he did not prioritize party loyalty, he was known as being able to cooperate with anyone.

== Personal life ==
He married Sumikalimah, an elementary school teacher, in October 1937, in Jakarta. Sumikalimah was the younger sister of Abdul Rasyid's mother.

Political offices
Preceded by Soekiman Wirjosandjojo	Prime Minister of Indonesia; 3 April 1952 – 30 July 1953	Succeeded by Ali Sastroamidjojo
Preceded by Achmad Soebardjo	Minister of Foreign Affairs; 1952	Succeeded by Moekarto Notowidigdo
