= Masyumi Party =

Major Islamic political party in Indonesia

Council of Indonesian Muslim Associations Majelis Syuro Muslimin Indonesia
- Abbreviation: Masyumi
- Chairman: Hasyim Asyari (first); Prawoto Mangkusasmito (last)
- Secretary-General: Various
- Founded: 24 October 1943 (organization); 7 November 1945 (party)
- Banned: 13 September 1960
- Merger of: Nahdlatul Ulama (until 1952); Muhammadiyah; Indonesian Islamic Union Party
- Preceded by: Supreme Islamic Council of Indonesia (MIAI)
- Succeeded by: Indonesian Islamic Propagation Council; Parmusi; Crescent Star Family (later became Crescent Star Party); Masyumi Party (2020) (claimed)
- Headquarters: Jakarta, Indonesia
- Newspaper: Abadi
- Women's wing: Muslimat Masyumi
- Membership (peak): Tens of millions
- Ideology: Islamic democracy Pan-Islamism; Anti-communism; Conservatism; Factions: Islamic modernism (Indonesia); Islamic tradionalism (Indonesia)
- Political position: Centre-right to right-wing
- Religion: Sunni Islam

The Council of Indonesian Muslim Associations (Indonesian: Majelis Syuro Muslimin Indonesia), better known as the Masyumi Party or simply Masyumi, was a major Islamic political party in Indonesia during the Liberal Democracy period of the 1950s. In 1960, the Masyumi was banned by President Sukarno for supporting the Revolutionary Government of the Republic of Indonesia (PRRI) rebellion.

== Background ==
In 1909, a trade organization called the Islamic Trading Association (Indonesian: Sarekat Dagang Islam) was established in Java, then part of the Dutch East Indies, to protect the interests of batik traders in the face of competition from ethnic Chinese merchants. In 1912, this became the Sarekat Islam (Islamic Union) and was headed by Western-educated Oemar Said Tjokroaminoto.

Although it began as a non-political organization, it began to speak out against injustice and poverty. By 1918, it had 450,000 members. Communist influence within it grew, but so did that of the reformist Islamic Muhammadiyah organization, which was anti-communist. In 1920, Muhammadiyah merged into Sarkat Islam. In 1923, Tjokroaminoto moved to expel communists from the organization at the SI Congress and established the Islamic Union Party (Indonesian: Partai Sarekat Islam - PSI), which adopted a policy of non-collaboration with the Dutch.

In 1929 the party was renamed the Indonesian Islamic Union Party (PSII). The next few years saw splits within the party, worsened by the death of Tjokroaminoto in 1937. In September 1937, Muhammadiyah and the traditionalist Nahdlatul Ulama established the Supreme Islamic Council of Indonesia (MIAI), an umbrella group for Islamic organizations. Following their 1942 invasion of the Dutch East Indies, the Japanese authorities banned the PSII but allowed the MIAI to continue. However, it became dominated by former PSII members, so it in turn was dissolved in 1943.

In November the Japanese established an organization called the Council of Indonesian Muslim Associations (Masyumi) in an attempt to control Islam in Indonesia. It too included Muhammadiyah and the Nahdlatul Ulama. However, Muslims resented the attempt to use them as tools of the Japanese and were especially angered by the obligation to bow towards the Imperial Palace in Tokyo (kyūjō-yōhai), rather than Mecca. However, the new organization became highly politicized and established a network across the country.

== Post-independence period ==
Following the Indonesian Proclamation of Independence, on 17 August 1945 a new organization called Masyumi was formed as an umbrella organization that represented both conservatives and modernist Muslim organizations. The founders wanted to take advantage of the organization's fame and structure, but there was considerable discussion as to whether to retain the name, due to its association with the Japanese occupiers. Its membership included key figures from the wartime Masyumi such as Hasyim Asy'ari and Wahid Hasyim, the PSII, and non-political Islamic organizations such as the traditionalist Nahdlatul Ulama and the modernist Muhammadiyah. The main leaders were Mohammad Natsir, Mohammad Roem, Sjafruddin Prawiranegara, Jusuf Wibisono and Abu Hanafi.

Its chief aims were the achievement of Indonesian independence and the establishment of a state governed by Islamic principles. It was strongly anti-communist. Along with the Indonesian National Party (PNI) and the Socialist Party of Indonesia (PSI), it played a dominant role in Indonesian politics from 1945 to 1949. Two Masyumi members, including Natsir, served in the cabinet appointed in November 1945, while 35 Masyumi members were appointed to the Central Indonesian National Committee, and four to its Working Committee. Masyumi members subsequently served in the first and second Hatta cabinets and in the cabinet of the short-lived United States of Indonesia. In April 1947, the PSII left Masyumi following disagreements with the leadership, particularly Natsir.

== Liberal Democracy era ==
There were two main factions within the party. The first, led by Natsir, attracted support from the younger generation who had participated in the Indonesian National Revolution and from the non-Javanese membership. The second faction, headed by Soekiman Wirjosandjojo, was supported by ethnic Javanese members, and had closer links with the Nahdlatul Ulama, the PNI leadership, and President Sukarno. The party as a whole had more support from non-urban areas of Indonesia. It also controlled its newspaper, Abadi.

From the beginning, the party had an ideological orientation centered on Islam and occupied a conservative position in Indonesia’s political spectrum. Masyumi emerged as a coalition of Muslim organizations that promoted Islam as the main basis of political life and supported the idea of establishing an Islamic state. Its leadership combined modernist Muslim intellectuals such as Mohammad Natsir and Sjafruddin Prawiranegara with traditional religious figures like Wahid Hasyim, producing a pragmatic but strongly religious political orientation. The party’s support base largely came from devout rural Muslims, village religious leaders, small traders, private businesses, and landholders, which reinforced its conservative outlook and strong anti-communist stance. After its dissolution during the presidency of Sukarno, its ideological influence continued through Muslim youth and student organizations often regarded as successors to the Masyumi tradition.

By 1950, Masyumi was considered the largest political party in Indonesia. On this basis it was awarded 49 seats, the largest number, in the 232-seat legislature, the People's Representative Council, when this was formed following the dissolution of the United States of Indonesia in August.

In the same month, Sukarno asked Natsir to form a cabinet. Natsir attempted to negotiate with the second-largest party, the PNI, but was unsuccessful, and in September announced the formation of his cabinet with support from the PSI and other smaller parties. However, this cabinet lasted less than seven months, falling in March 1951 after losing support from the smaller parties and parliament. It was followed by two Masyumi-PNI coalition cabinets, the first from April 1951 to February 1952 with Masyumi figure Soekiman as Prime Minister (but with no representation from the Natsir faction) and the next (April 1952 - June 1953) led by Wilopo from the PNI, with a Masyumi deputy prime minister, Prawoto Mangkusasmito.

Shortly after the Wilopo cabinet took office, the Nahdlatul Ulama began the process of withdrawing from Masyumi following protracted disputes, including a conflict over the cabinet's refusal to reappoint key NU figure Wahid Hasyim to the post of religious affairs minister. The NU decided at its congress in 1952 to become an independent political party. This split damaged the standing of the Masyumi and its claim to be the sole party for Indonesia's Muslims.

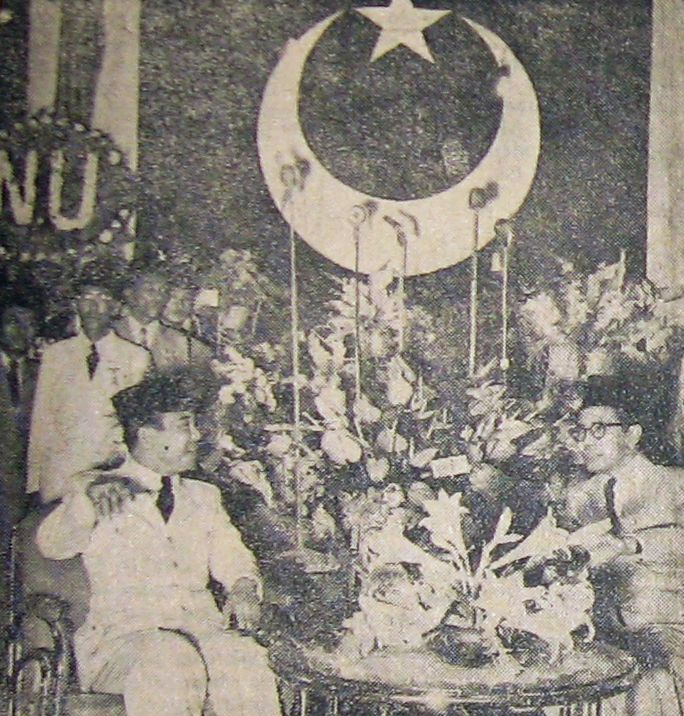
President Sukarno at a 1954 Masyumi convention

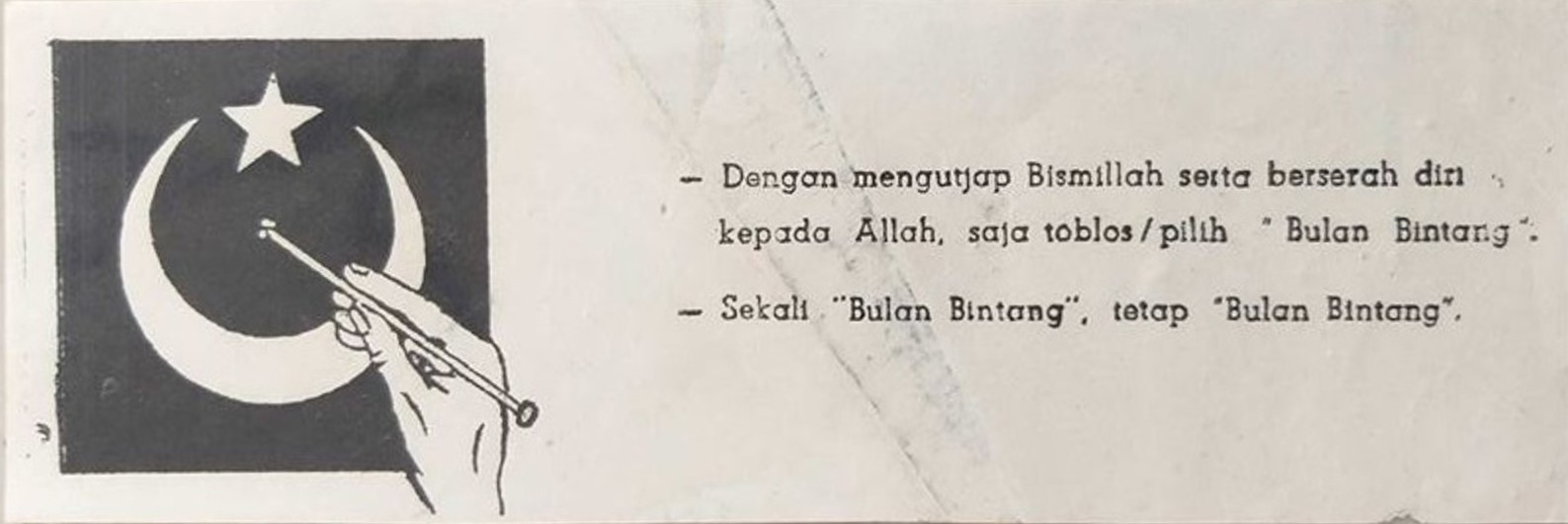
A pamphlet released by Masyumi for the 1955 election

Elections had originally been scheduled for 1946. Many parties were worried that Masyumi would emerge as an outright winner and tried to delay the vote, but in April 1953, an election law was finally enacted scheduling elections for parliament for September 1955, and for the Constitutional Assembly for December 1955. Masyumi expected to gain a majority in both institutions, which would allow the party to push through its Islamism agenda, including a constitution based on Islam. The party received a million US dollars from the CIA for their election efforts.

The results of the legislative election were a major disappointment for Masyumi, which came in second, representing only 20.9% of the popular vote, and resulting in 57 seats in parliament. Masyumi was popular in modernist Islamic regions such as West Sumatra, South Sumatra, and South Sulawesi. One of Indonesia's first female legislators, educational activist Rahmah el Yunusiyah, was elected from West Sumatra for the Masyumi party at this contest. About 51.3% of Masyumi's vote came from Java, but Masyumi was the dominant party for regions outside Java, and it established itself as the leading party for one third of people living outside Java. However, it was one of four major parties, rather than the dominant political force it had been before the elections.

== The end of the party ==
In the mid-1950s, the PRRI rebellion broke out. In November 1957, senior Masyumi figures Mohammad Natsir, Sjafruddin Prawiranegara, and Burhanuddin Harahap, joined the rebels in the Sumatran city of Padang. The Masyumi Party refused to condemn their actions, which damaged the party's image. In 1960, President Sukarno passed a law allowing him to ban parties whose ideologies conflicted with those of the state, or whose members rebelled against the state, and he subsequently used this law to threaten Masyumi to either dissolve itself or be forcefully dissolved. Following the collapse of the rebellion, Natsir and Sjafruddin, along with other senior Masjumi figures, were jailed in January 1962.

== Election results ==
=== People's Representative Council ===
| Election date | Party leader | Seats | Seat change | Votes | % of votes | Outcome of election |
|---|---|---|---|---|---|---|
| 1955 | Mohammad Natsir | 57 / 257 | | 7,903,886 | 20.92% | Opposition |

=== Constitutional Assembly ===
| Election date | Party leader | Votes | % of votes | Seats | Bloc |
|---|---|---|---|---|---|
| 1955 | Mohammad Natsir | 7,789,619 | 20.59% | 112 / 514 | Islamic Bloc |

== Successor organizations ==
Following the banning, Masyumi members and followers established the Crescent Star Family (Indonesian: Keluarga Bulan Bintang) to campaign for Islamic shariah law and teachings. An attempt was made to reestablish the party following the fall of Sukarno, but this was not permitted. However, the government eventually permitted the establishment of the Muslim Party of Indonesia (Parmusi) in 1968 but refused to allow former Masyumi members to lead the party.

Meanwhile, in 1967, Mohammad Natsir and a few of his close associates, including Mohammad Roem, established the Indonesian Islamic Propagation Council (DDII), which was based at the former head office of Masyumi. As well as a refuge for former Masyumi supporters, the organization campaigned against "Christianization" of Indonesia and appealed for support from the lower social classes. After the fall of Suharto in 1998, another attempt was made to revive the Masyumi name, but eventually, Masyumi followers and others established the Crescent Star Party, which contested the legislative elections in 1999, 2004, 2009 and 2014.

Two other parties, known as the Masyumi Party, established by former Masyumi member Mawardi Noor, and the New Masyumi Party, contested the 1999 election, but won only 0.22% and 0.14% of the vote respectively, which was enough for the former to be awarded one seat in the legislature. Neither party contested subsequent elections. The formation of a new party with the same name claiming to be the revived party was announced in November 2020 by a group of Islamic activists. However, it failed to meet the requirements to contest the 2024 Indonesian general election.

== See also ==
- Politics of Indonesia
- List of political parties in Indonesia
- Pan-Islamism
