= Wilopo Cabinet =

Cabinet of Indonesia (1952–1953)

Wilopo Cabinet Kabinet Wilopo
- Cabinet of Indonesia
- 3 April 1952 – 1 August 1953
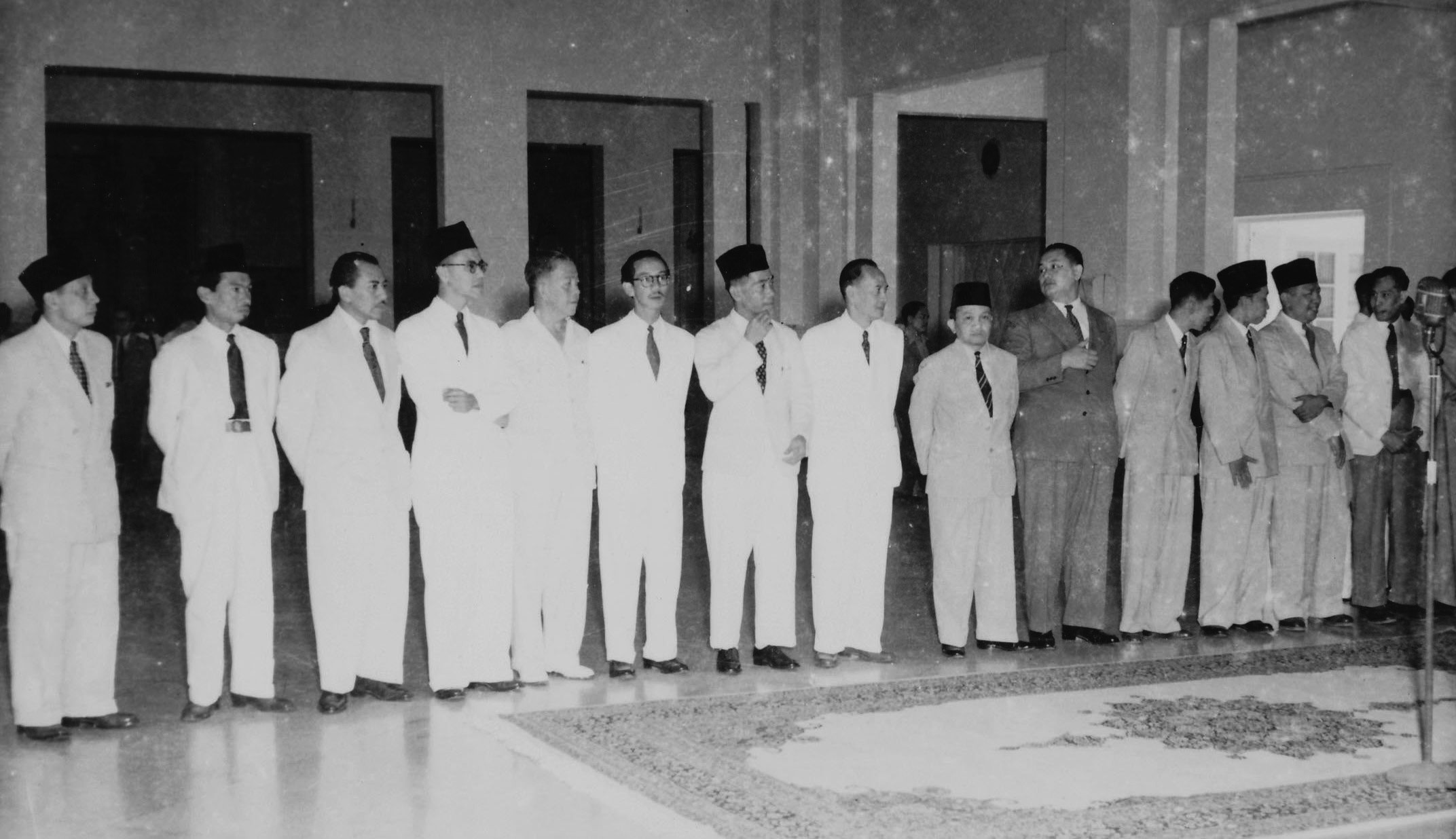
- Members of the cabinet at the Merdeka Palace
- Date formed: 3 April 1952
- Date dissolved: 1 August 1953

People and organisations
- President: Sukarno
- Prime Minister: Wilopo
- Member parties: PNI; Masyumi; PSI; Catholic; Labour; PSII; Parkindo; Parindra

History
- Predecessor: Soekiman
- Successor: Ali Sastroamidjodo I

The Wilopo Cabinet (Indonesian: Kabinet Wilopo) (Note: Sometimes referred to as the Wilopo–Prawoto Cabinet (Indonesian: Kabinet Wilopo–Prawoto).) was the cabinet of Indonesia led by Wilopo as the prime minister which was in office from April 1952 to August 1953. The cabinet was a coalition government consisting of the Indonesian National Party (PNI) and the Masyumi Party, along with several smaller parties.

== Composition ==
=== Cabinet Leadership ===
- Prime Minister: Wilopo (Indonesian National Party – PNI)
- Deputy Prime Minister: Prawoto Mangkusasmito (Masyumi Party)

=== Cabinet Members ===
- Minister of Foreign Affairs ad interim: Wilopo (Indonesian National Party - PNI)
- Minister of Home Affairs: Mohammad Roem (Masyumi Party)
- Minister of Defense: Sultan Hamengkubuwana IX
- Minister of Justice: Lukman Wiriadinata (Socialist Party of Indonesia - PSI)
- Minister of Information: Arnold Mononutu (Indonesian National Party – PNI)
- Minister of Finance: Sumitro Djojohadikusumo (Socialist Party of Indonesia - PSI)
- Minister of Agriculture: Mohammad Sardjan (Masyumi Party)
- Minister of Economic Affairs: Soemanang Soerjowinoto (Indonesian National Party – PNI)
- Minister of Transport: Djuanda
- Minister of Public Works and Power: Suwarto (PKRI)
- Minister of Labor: Iskandar Tedjasukmana (Labour Party)
- Minister of Social Affairs: Anwar Tjokroaminoto (Indonesian Islamic Union Party - PSII)
- Minister of Education & Culture: Bahder Djohan
- Minister of Religious Affairs: Fakih Usman (Masyumi Party)
- Minister of Health: Dr. Johannes Leimena (Parkindo)
- Minister of Employee Affairs: R. P. Soeroso (Parindra)

== Tenure ==
=== 17 October affair ===
The Wilopo Cabinet's proposals to reorganize the army to conserve budgets were unpopular with the army. The Army's high command came into dispute with the parliament in what it saw as excessive civilian meddling within military affairs. After a dismissal of a pro-government officer in July 1952, the parliament began demanding a significant restructuring of armed forces leadership, and after three months tensions culminated in thousands of demonstrators mobilized by the army in Jakarta. President Sukarno managed to temper the demonstrators and assure the army officers, but refused to concede to any demands. Soon after the incident, a significant proportion of the army's high command was replaced.

=== Tanjung Morawa affair ===
On 16 March 1953, a clash between peasant squatters and the police occurred in Tanjung Morawa, North Sumatra. The incident, known as the Tanjung Morawa affair, stemmed from a land dispute between the squatters and foreign plantation owners, resulted in the deaths of five peasants and the downfall of the cabinet.

== Changes ==
- Mukarto Notowidagdo (PNI) was appointed Minister of Foreign Affairs on 29 April 1952, releasing Wilopo from his dual role.
- On 11 May 1953 Social Minister Anwar Tjokroaminoto resigned and was replaced by Employee Affairs Minister Suroso. Responsibility for employee affairs was transferred to Prime Minister.
- On 2 January 1953 Defense Minister Sultan Hamengkubuwana IX resigned and Prime Minister Wilopo became ad interim Defense Minister.
