= Emon Bratadiwidjaja =

Indonesian politician

Member of Provisional House of Representatives
- In office 21 August 1950 – 26 March 1956
- President: Soekarno

Member of House of Representatives of the United States of Indonesia
- In office 25 Mei 1950 – 16 August 1950
- President: Soekarno
- Constituency: Pasundan

Personal details
- Born: 12 February 1914 Cirebon, Dutch East Indies
- Party: Labour Party
- Profession: Politician

Emon Bratadiwidjaja (12 February 1914 - ?) was an Indonesian politician who served as a member of the House of Representatives of the United States of Indonesia (1950) and the Provisional House of Representatives (1950–1956).

== Biography ==
=== Early life and education ===
Bratadiwidjaja was born in Cirebon on 12 February 1914. He completed high school at MULO up to the 2nd grade. He also enrolled in a trade and a 3-year English course.

=== Early career ===
Bratadiwidjaja worked for the Ministry of Health from 1933 to 1945. He was first stationed in Pandeglang, then Batavia, Ciamis, and eventually in Serang. During the Japanese occupation era, he served as the spokesperson.

From 1946 to 1949, he served in various positions such as Secretary of the Indonesian Red Cross Society of Serang, Member of the Working Committee of Banten Central Regional Committee, representative of the Labour Party, Head of Economic Affairs of the Banten Residency, chairman of the Indonesia People's Weaving Association (GAPEI) in Cirebon, and teacher at PEKERTI high school. In Banten, he also founded the Banten branch of the Labor Party and served as its vice chairman, secretary general, and chairman of the political council.

Before Bratadiwidjaja served as a member of the House of Representatives of the United States of Indonesia, from 1949 to 1950, he worked as the extension officer, concurrently serving as deputy head of the Department of Industry and Crafts and chairman of the Labor Union of the Cirebon branch's Ministry of Trade and Industry, and secretary general of the Cirebon Sub-Consulate Economic Council. Furthermore, he attended the Inter-Indonesian Economic Conference in Yogyakarta, representing the people's industry faction.

=== Member of Parliament ===
On 25 May 1950, Bratadiwidjaja was appointed as a member of the House of Representatives of the United States of Indonesia from the Pasundan region. After the dissolution of the United States of Indonesia, the Provisional House of Representatives was formed, and he became a member of it on 21 August 1950 from the Labour Party. Within the Labour Party leadership, he served as the secretary and member of the party's political bureau. While Serving as the Member of Provisional House of Representatives, he became the leader of Section F (Labour, Social Affairs, and Personnel Affairs). He suggested the nationalization of quinine factory in Bandung, yet it received objection from Johannes Leimena.

Bratadiwidjaja ran for a seat in the House of Representatives and Constitutional Assembly of Indonesia in the 1955 election for two different parties, which were the Labor Party and Raja Keprabon and Associates, the latter together with Radja Keprabonan. In the legislative election, he represented West Nusa Tenggara (Labor Party), West Java and Central Java (Raja Keprabon and Associates), whereas in the constitutional Assembly election, he represented West Nusa Tenggara (Labor Party) and Central Java (Raja Keprabon and Associates).

== Bibliographies ==
- Departemen Penerangan RI, Departemen Penerangan RI (1956). Kumpulan Peraturan-Peraturan untuk Pemilihan Konstituante (PDF). Departemen Penerangan RI.
- Departemen Penerangan (1955). Tjalon-Tjalon Dewan Perwakilan Rakjat untuk Pemilihan Umum I 1955. Jakarta: Kementerian Penerangan.
- Sekretariat DPR-GR, Sekretariat DPR-GR (1970). Seperempat abad Dewan Perwakilan Rakjat Republik Indonesia. Jakarta: DPR-GR.
