= Jakarta Charter =

Draft preamble to the Constitution of the Republic of Indonesia

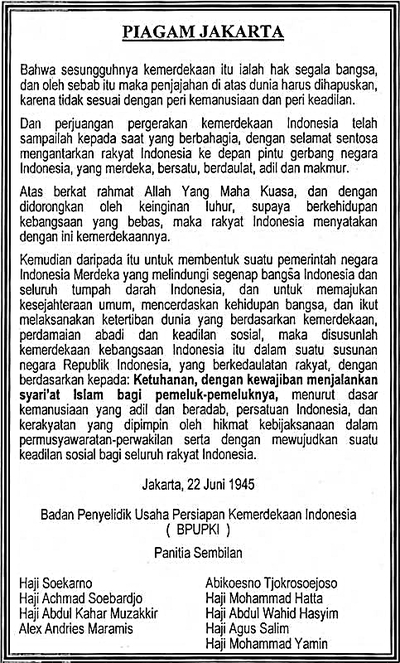
- The Jakarta Charter Manuscript written using Improved Spelling system. Sentences containing the famous "seven words" are bolded in this image
- Author: Committee of Nine
- Original title: Undang-Undang Dasar Negara Republik Indonesia Tahun 1945, Mukadimah
- Language: Indonesian (Van Ophuijsen Spelling System)
- Publication date: 22 June 1945
- Publication place: Indonesia
- Text: Jakarta Charter at Wikisource

The Jakarta Charter (Indonesian: Piagam Jakarta) was a document drawn up by members of the Indonesian Investigating Committee for Preparatory Work for Independence (BPUPK) on 22 June 1945 in Jakarta that later formed the basis of the preamble to the Constitution of Indonesia. The document contained the five principles of the Pancasila ideology, but it also included an obligation for Muslims to abide by Shariah law. This obligation, which was also known as the "Seven Words" (tujuh kata), was eventually deleted from the enacted constitution on 18 August 1945, a day after the Indonesian declaration of independence . Following the deletion of the "Seven Words" efforts by Islamic parties continued to seek its inclusion, most notably in the late 1950s, during the debates over a definitive constitution; in 1967-1968, during the Transition to the New Order; and from 2000-2002, following the end of the New Order and the beginning of the Reformasi era.

== Background ==
=== Founding of the BPUPK ===
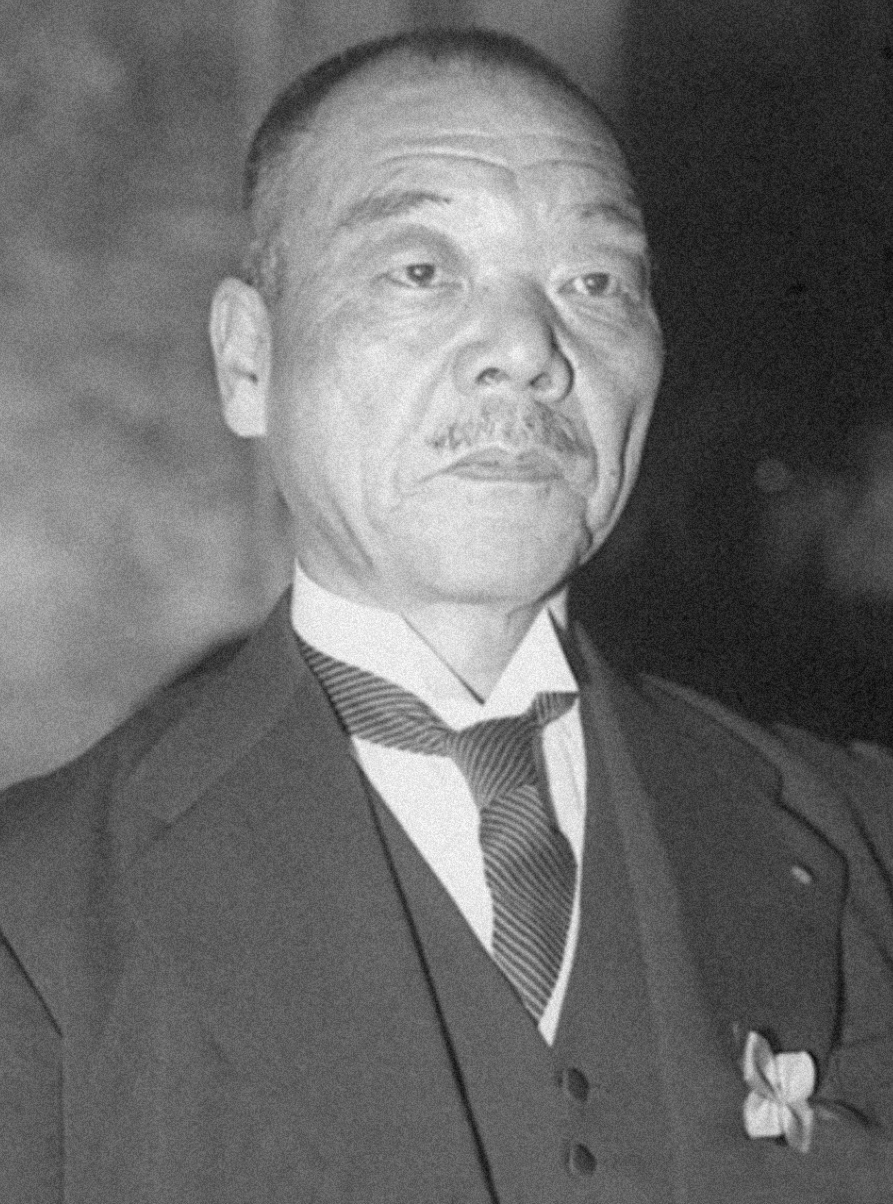
Prime Minister of Japan, Kuniaki Koiso

Three years after the Japanese invaded and occupied the Dutch East Indies, Prime Minister of Japan, Kuniaki Koiso, realising Japan was losing the war, promised on 7 September 1944, in a session of the Japanese parliament, that independence for the Dutch East Indies would be achieved "later on". In February 1945, partly in response to the Koiso's declaration, the 16th Army decided to establish a committee to investigate Indonesian independence, known as the Investigating Committee for Preparatory Work for Independence (BPUPK). This was intended as a concession to Indonesian nationalists, and the Japanese hoped it would redirect nationalist enthusiasm towards harmless arguments between factions. The BPUPK was announced by the Japanese administration on 1 March 1945 to work on "preparations for independence in the region of the government of this island of Java."

=== First BPUPK session ===
The committee, which was supposed to lay the foundations for the national identity of Indonesia by drafting a constitution, consisted of 62 Indonesian members, 47 of whom belonged to the secular nationalists and 15 to the Islamists. Members of the Islamist camp wanted a new state which was based on sharia law, as opposed to a secular state. An independent nation based on Islam had been an aspiration for many prominent Muslims since the 1920s. The first BPUPK session was held in Jakarta from 29 May to 1 June 1945. On the final day, Sukarno gave his famous speech in which he introduced the principles of the Pancasila.

== Committee of Nine ==
Sukarno, the chairman of the committee

In the recess between the two BPUPK sessions, at the urging of future president Sukarno, the delegates set up an eight-person Small Commission (Panitia Kecil), which was headed by Sukarno and had the task of collecting and discussing the proposals submitted by the other delegates. To reduce tensions between the national and Islamic groups, Sukarno formed a Committee of Nine on 18 June 1945 tasked with formulating the preamble to the Indonesian constitution that was acceptable to both nationalists and Islamists. These members, and their affiliations were:.

=== Secular Muslim nationalists ===
- Sukarno
- Mohammad Hatta
- Mohammad Yamin
- Achmad Soebardjo

=== Muslim nationalists ===
- Abikoesno Tjokrosoejoso
- Abdoel Kahar Moezakir
- Agus Salim
- Wahid Hasjim

=== Secular Christian nationalist ===
- A.A. Maramis

== Compromise ==
=== Results of the committee ===
Over the course of the afternoon of 22 June, the nine men produced a preamble for the constitution that included Sukarno's Pancasila philosophy, but with the principle of "belief in one god" as the first principle, not the fifth as it was in Sukarno's 1 June speech. The committee also added the seven words in Indonesian (dengan kewajiban menjalankan syariat Islam bagi pemeluknya) that placed an obligation on Muslims to abide by Islamic Shariah law. Mohammad Yamin, who played a dominant role in the wording, named the preamble the Jakarta Charter.

=== Second BPUPK session ===
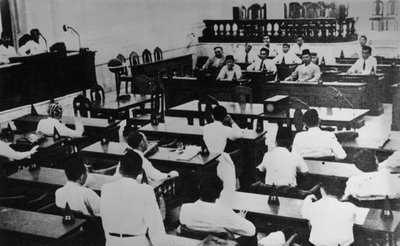
The second conference of the BPUPK, from 10 - 17 July 1945

In accordance with the advice of the Committee of Nine, the BPUPK held its second (and final) session from 10 to 17 July 1945. The aim was to discuss issues related to the constitution, including the draft preamble contained in the Jakarta Charter. On the first day, Sukarno reported on the discussions held during the recess. He also reported that the Small Committee had unanimously accepted the Jakarta Charter, which he said contained "all the points of thought that filled the chests of most of the members of Dokuritu Zyunbi Tyoosakai [BPUPK]."

On the second day of the session (July 11), three BPUPK members expressed their rejection of the "Seven Words" (Tujuh Kata) in the Jakarta Charter. Most notably, Johannes Latuharhary, who was a Protestant member from Ambon, disagreed sgrongly with the "Seven Words." He felt that their presence in the Jakarta Charter would have a large impact on other religions. He also expressed his concern that they would force the Minangkabau to abandon their customs and also affect land rights based on customary law in Maluku. Two other members who disagreed with the seven words were Wongsonegoro and Hoesein Djajadiningrat. Both were worried that the they would cause fanaticism among Muslims, a worry Wahid Hasyim (another member of the committee), dismissed. However, BUPUK member Soepomo said the wording of the charter resulted from a "gentleman's agreement" (he used the English term), which had been unanimous, and should therefore be retained.

=== Preparatory Committee ===
==== Proclamation of Independence ====
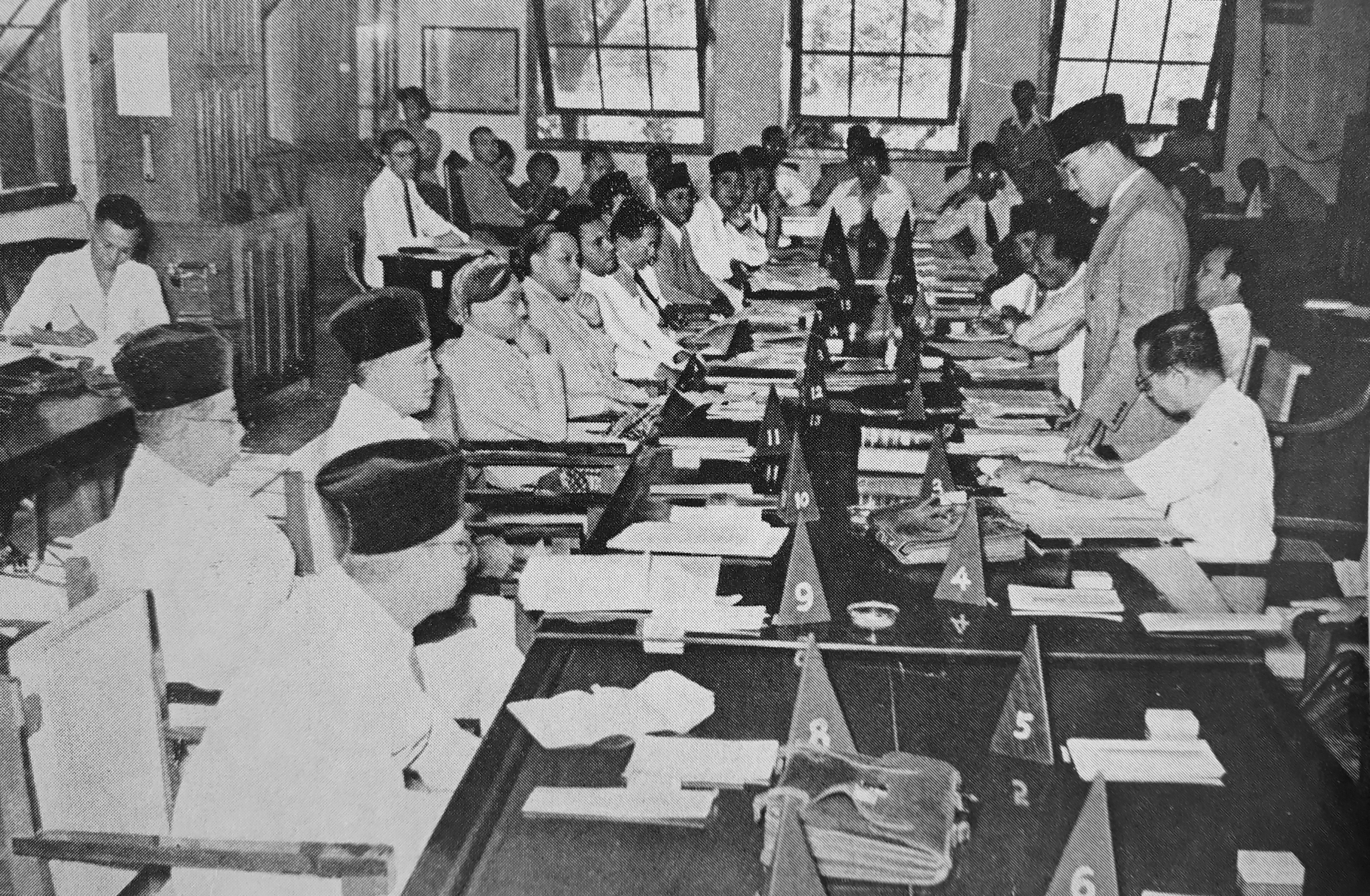
Session of the Preparatory Committee for Indonesian Independence on 18 August 1945

On 7 August 1945, the Japanese government announced the formation of the Preparatory Committee for Indonesian Independence (PPKI). Then, on 12 August, Sukarno was appointed as its chairman by the Commander of the Southern Expeditionary Group Field Marshal Hisaichi Terauchi. Only four of the nine Jakarta Charter signatories were members of the PPKI, namely Sukarno, Mohammad Hatta, Achmad Soebardjo, and Wahid Hasyim. Initially PPKI members planned to gather on 19 August to finalize Indonesia's constitution. However, on 6 and 9 August 1945, the Allies dropped atomic bombs on the cities of Hiroshima and Nagasaki, and on August 15, Emperor Hirohito announced that Japan had unconditionally surrendered to the Allies.

On 17 August 1945, Sukarno and Hatta declared Indonesian independence. The following day, the Preparatory Committee for Indonesian Independence (PPKI) was due to meet to ratify Indonesia's constitution. Hatta in particular and Sukarno were both worried that the obligation on Muslims would alienate non-Muslims. Before the meeting, Hatta met with Muslim leaders and managed to persuade them to agree to the removal of the seven words "for the sake of national unity". The PPKI then met and elected Sukarno and Hatta president and vice-president respectively. It then discussed the draft constitution, including the preamble.

==== Erasing of the "Seven Words" ====
During the meeting, Hatta suggested that the "seven words" in the Preamble, as well as the stipulations in Article 29 also obliging Muslims to follow Shariah law and for the president to be a Muslim be deleted. As Hatta later explained in his book, around the evening of 17 August, a Imperial Japanese Navy officer had spoken to him and conveyed the news that a Christian nationalist group from Eastern Indonesia opposed the "seven words" because they were considered discriminatory against religious minorities, and they even stated that it would be better to establish their own state outside the Republic of Indonesia if the seven words were not removed. Hatta also proposed the term "God" be replaced with "the one and only God", and also the Arabic word"Mukadimah" be changed to "Preamble". These proposals were all accepted. Balinese delegate I Gusti Ketut Pudja suggested replacing the Arabic word Allah with the Indonesian word for God (Tuhan). This was accepted, but for some reason when the constitution was officially published, this change was not made. Following further discussion, the constitution was approved.

There are a number of possible reasons why the PPKI agreed to Hatta's proposal without any resistance from the Islamic group. Firstly, the composition of the PPKI was very different from that of the BPUPK: only 12% of PPKI members were from the Islamic group (in the BPUPK there were 24%). Of the nine signatories to the Jakarta Charter, only three attended the meeting on 18 August. These three were not from the Islamic group; Hasyim only arrived in Jakarta from Surabaya on August 19. Secondly, Hatta's rephrasing "the one and only God" was seen by Muslims as more in line with their concept of God's unique status. Thirdly, Islamists hoped that they still hoped that a Muslim-dominated People's Consultative Assembly would be able to pass laws or amend the constitution in line with their wishes. Finally, Indonesia at that time was facing the arrival of Allied troops, so that the priority was national defense and unity, and efforts to fight for the aspirations of the Islamic group could be postponed until the situation allowed.

== Subsequent developments ==
When the 1945 constitution was replaced by the United States of Indonesia Federal Constitution of 1949, and this in turn replaced by the Provisional Constitution of 1950, there were no attempts to include the seven words in the preambles, despite their similarity to 1945 version. In 1955, Indonesia held its first legislative election, followed a few months later by elections for a Constitutional Assembly, which would draw up a definitive constitution. To the dismay of Islamists, who had expected majorities in both, Muslim parties won only a minority of seats, effectively ending their hopes of a constitution based on Islam. In 1959, the Constitutional Assembly reached deadlock as the Islamist faction wanted a greater role for Islam, but like the other factions, did not have enough support to win the two-thirds majority to push through its proposals. The Islamist faction supported the government's proposal to return to the 1945 Constitution on condition that the obligation on Muslims - the "seven words" - be re-inserted in the preamble. The nationalist faction voted this down, and in response, the Islamist faction vetoed the reintroduction of the 1945 Constitution. On 9 July 1959, Sukarno issued a decree dissolving the assembly and reinstating the original constitution, but without the seven words the Islamists wanted. To placate them, Sukarno stated that his decree relied on the Jakarta Charter, which had inspired the 1945 Constitution and which was an "inseparable" from, but not a legal part of it.

There were further attempts to revive the Jakarta Charter. Following the fall of Sukarno the 1966 session of the Provisional People's Consultative Assembly (MPRS), calls for recognition of the Jakarta Charter were ignored. Then in the 1967 session and the 1968 Special Session, attempts by parties including Parmusi, a new Islamist party, calling for it to have legal force, were voted down. In 1999, after the end of the authoritarian New Order regime, the MPR realised the need for amendments to the Constitution. However, all factions agreed to leave the preamble unchanged, effectively ruling out the insertion of the "seven words" and an Islamic character to the Constitution. After the 1999 elections, and the need for caution in expressing controversial options, some Islamist politicians called for the "seven words" to be added to article 29 of the Consultation. In 2002, during the MPR session that passed the final amendments to the constitution, a number of small Islamic parties with the support of Vice-president Hamzah Haz made a last attempt to amend Article 29 of the Constitution to make shariah law obligatory on Muslims, but they were resoundingly defeated. There was never any hope of success, given the lack of a majority in favour, but this symbolic effort sent a signal to the supporters of the Islamist parties that their party was aware of their aspirations.

== Text of the document ==
Indonesian (Note: The text uses the Van Ophuijsen Spelling System, instead of the Improved Spelling system.)
Bahwa sesoenggoehnja kemerdekaan itoe jalah hak segala bangsa, dan oleh sebab itoe maka pendjadjahan diatas doenia haroes dihapoeskan, karena tidak sesoeai dengan peri-kemanoesiaan dan peri-keadilan.

English
As independence is the right of every people, any form of subjugation in this world, being contrary to humanity (prikemanusiaan) and justice (pri-keadilan), must be abolished.

Dan perdjoeangan pergerakan kemerdekaan Indonesia telah sampailah kepada saat jang berbahagia dengan selamat-sentaoesa mengantarkan rakjat Indonesia kedepan pintoe gerbang Negara Indonesia jang merdeka, bersatoe, berdaoelat, adil dan makmoer.

Now the struggle of the Indonesian independence movement has reached the blessed hour which the Indonesian people have safe and sound been led to the portal of the Indonesian state, which is to be independence, united, sovereign, just and prosperous.

Atas berkat Rahmat Allah Jang Maha Koeasa, dan dengan didorongkan oleh keinginan luhur, soepaja berkehidupan kebangsaan jang bebas, maka rakjat Indonesia dengan ini menjatakan kemerdekaanja.

By the grace of Almighty God and moved by the highest ideals to lead a free national life, the Indonesian people hereby declare their independence.

Kemoedian dari pada itu untuk membentoek soeatu Pemerintah Negara Indonesia jang melindungi segenap bangsa Indonesia dan seloeroeh toempah-dara Indonesia, dan oentoek memadjoekan kesedjahteraan oemoem, mentjerdaskan kehidoepan bangsa, dan ikoet melaksanakan ketertiban doenia jang berdasarkan kemerdekaan, perdamaian abadi dan keadilan sosial, maka disoesoenlah kemerdekaan kebangsaan Indonesia itoe dalam soeatu hoekoem dasar Negara Indonesia jang terbentuk dalam soeatu soesoenan negara Republik Indonesia, jang berkedaoelatan rakjat, dengan berdasar kepada: ketoehanan, dengan kewadjiban mendjalankan sjari'at Islam bagi pemeloek-pemeloeknja, menoeroet dasar kemanoesiaan jang adil dan beradab, persatoean Indonesia, dan kerakjatan jang dipimpin oleh hikmat kebidjaksanaan dalam permoesjawaratan/perwakilan serta dengan mewoedjoedkan soeatu keadilan sosial bagi seloeroeh rakjat Indonesia.

Further, in order to establish for the Indonesian state a government which will protect the whole Indonesian people and all Indonesian territory and to promote public welfare, to raise the educational level of the people, and to participate in establishing a world order founded on freedom everlasting peace and social justice, national independence is hereby expressed in a Constitution of the Indonesian state which is molded in the form of the Republic of Indonesia, resting upon the people's sovereignty and founded on (the following principles): The Belief in God, with the obligation to carry out the Syariah Islam for its adherents in accordance with the principle of righteous and moral humanitarianism; the unity, and a democracy led by wise policy of the mutual deliberation of a representative body and ensuring social justice for the whole Indonesian people.
