= Amendments to the Constitution of Indonesia =

The Constitution of Indonesia has been amended four times since its creation, all of which were approved by the People's Consultative Assembly (MPR) during the 1999 – 2002 period.

The procedure to amend the constitution is dictated in Article 37 of the Constitution. The amendment is wholly processed by all components of the legislature, the MPR, as a joint sitting of its two components, the People's Representative Council (DPR) and the Regional Representative Council (DPD).

== Amendment procedure ==
The constitutional amendment procedure is dictated by the Article 37 of the Constitution. The current procedures were introduced by the Fourth amendment to the constitution in 2002.

The article requires an amendment to be proposed by at least a third of the entire People's Consultative Assembly (MPR) members on a written form describing the proposed amendments and its justification. The quorum for a parliamentary special session to amend the constitution is set at a two-thirds majority of the MPR members. An amendment proposal needs only a simple majority of 50%+1 to be passed by the MPR. The previous amendment procedure required a 2/3 supermajority for an amendment to pass; this was modified to a simple majority on the fourth amendment of the constitution.

Article 37 dictated the constitution's only entrenched clause is on prohibition to amend the nature of Indonesia as a unitary state.

== History ==
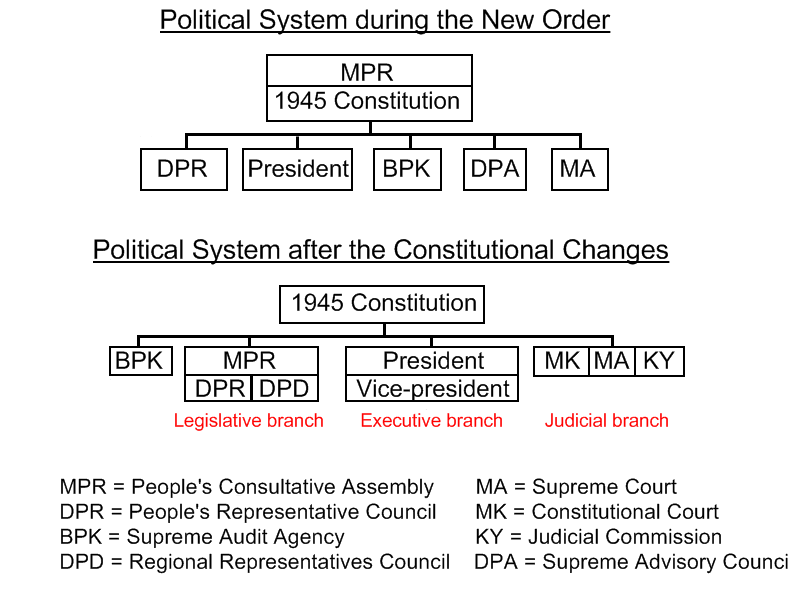
Indonesian political system before and after the constitutional amendments. Subsequent amendments reduced the power of the then-supreme People's Consultative Assembly to perfect the separation of powers in the country.

The first 1945 Constitution was abrogated by the Federal Constitution of 1949 for the entire period of the short-lived Republic of the United States of Indonesia, and later by the Provisional Constitution of 1950 on the Liberal democracy period in Indonesia (1950–1959). The 1945 Constitution was restored by a Presidential Decree on 5 July 1959 to address the Konstituante failure to set the replacement of the 1950 Constitution.

In the New Order regime, the authority committed to not amend the constitution, as they perceived the constitution as final and stated its "sanctity" should be protected. Despite the MPR having entrenched its no-amendment position on the TAP MPR 1/1983, the MPR also dictated a procedure to amend the constitution, which includes proposals to be submitted by minimum of 4 (out of 5) complete parliamentary fraction members and a two-thirds majority for the proposed amendment to pass. After the initial passage, the law further dictates for a constitutional referendum authorised by the President to take place, with a double supermajority of 90% of electorate turnout and support votes required. In case the threshold was achieved, the MPR could continue and finalise the amendment process.

After the 1998 Reform, the new regime was increasingly open on constitutional amendment proposals. The law requiring a referendum to amend the constitution passed in 1985 was revoked in March 1999, significantly simplifying the future constitutional amendment process. MPR Speaker Amien Rais presided over the entire four MPR sessions to amend the constitution during the 1999 – 2002 period.

== Amendments ==
=== First amendment ===
The first amendment was ratified in the MPR parliamentary session on 14–21 October 1999. In the first amendment, there were nine articles that were amended by the parliament, being Article 5, 7, 9, 13, 14, 15, 17, 20, and 21.

The amendment introduced a term limit of 5 years, renewable once, for both the president and vice president, and also allowed the president to be inaugurated before only the MPR speakers and Supreme Court justices in exceptional circumstances. The amendment also restricted executive power, as the president required MPR or Supreme Court consent beforehand on several occasions, such as before appointing ambassadors or granting amnesty.

The amendment revoked presidential power to write laws, now exclusively being a power of the legislature, with the president able only to propose laws instead of directly write laws.

=== Second amendment ===
The second amendment was ratified in the MPR parliamentary session on 7–18 August 2000. The second amendment involved modifications and additions to 21 articles.

The amendment recognises the autonomous status of Indonesian regions and introduces direct elections for regional leaders. The amendment also redefines functions of the DPR, and separation of functions of the military and the police. The second amendment introduces Nusantara as Indonesia's territorial character, new articles on human rights, and recognition of the constitutional status of the national anthem and the national emblem.

=== Third amendment ===
The third amendment was ratified in the MPR parliamentary session on 10 November 2001. The third amendment involved modifications of 23 articles and the addition of 3 chapters.

The third amendment provided a constitutional basis for the establishment of the Constitutional Court and removed clauses regarding the State Policy Guidelines (Garis Besar Haluan Negara, abbrev. GBHN) enacted by the People's Consultative Assembly as executive guidelines.

=== Fourth amendment ===
The fourth amendment was passed in the MPR parliamentary session on 1–11 August 2002.

The fourth amendment removed articles concerning the Supreme Advisory Council.

== Proposed amendments ==
Proposals to amend the constitution for a fifth time were heard since the final constitutional amendment was passed in 2002, and the most serious proposals were heard since 2019. The current proposals on amendment are concerned on the restoration of the State Policy Guidelines (GBHN), strengthening the Regional Representative Council (DPD RI) authority, and on the presidency. As of 2021, the proposed amendment on the GBHN restoration received the most traction, as major governing parties expressed their support for the proposal.

Public response to the proposed amendment are relatively negative, as they noted the amendment was not urgent amidst the COVID-19 pandemic in Indonesia, with more urgent matters to be addressed instead. Public members also voiced their concern that the proposed amendment would modify the presidential term limit, as the current term is the final for president Joko Widodo, whose term expires in 2024. He is also ineligible for reelection. To tackle public opposition to the amendment, MPR Speaker Bambang Soesatyo convinced the public that the amendment would not include other articles outside articles necessary for the GBHN restoration.

=== State policy guidelines restoration ===
During the New Order era, the GBHN was enacted by the then-supreme People's Consultative Assembly (MPR RI) in the form of MPR RI resolutions as development guidelines for the executives. The GBHN was abrogated by the third amendment in 2000 to perfect the separation of powers in Indonesia's presidential system.

The earliest proposal to reintroduce the State Policy Guidelines was made in 2019, and as of 2021 is mostly supported by members of governing parties who justified the necessity for the guidelines restoration to assure a long-term development plan, as currently the national policy guidelines are merely enacted by MPR decree, perceived as susceptible for executives' contravention.

Oppositions to the GBHN restoration pointed out that the GBHN is unnecessary, as the executive and the legislative branches are equal, and the MPR must not mandate the executives as if it is supreme over the presidency. Opponents also concerned the GBHN would make the president again subordinate to the MPR RI as during the New Order era, undoing the separation of powers achieved by the 1998 Reform and earlier constitutional amendments.

=== Regional Representative Council authority ===
The Regional Representative Council (Indonesian: Dewan Perwakilan Daerah, DPD) was established upon the third amendment to the Constitution in 2001 by elevating the People's Consultative Assembly (MPR RI) regional representatives' group status as members of the upper house of the parliament. The DPD power is relatively weak compared with upper houses in other countries — the DPD is responsible only on regional government matters, with no law-making or veto power relative to the People's Representative Council (DPR RI).

Amidst constitutional amendment discourses from 2020, DPD members supported a constitutional amendment to strengthen the authority of the upper house, allowing for a perfect bicameralism and checks and balances between the MPR RI's two houses.

=== Return to the original 1945 Constitution ===
Among illiberal academics and former New Order officials, there is a common belief that the four amendments to the 1945 Constitution are founded on liberalism and hence contrary to Pancasila, the Indonesian state philosophy. As a result, they advocated for a return to the original 1945 Constitution. Proponents of such views include Try Sutrisno, the former vice president; and Prabowo Subianto, the current president.
