= Djody Gondokusumo =

Indonesian politician and lawyer (1912–1966)

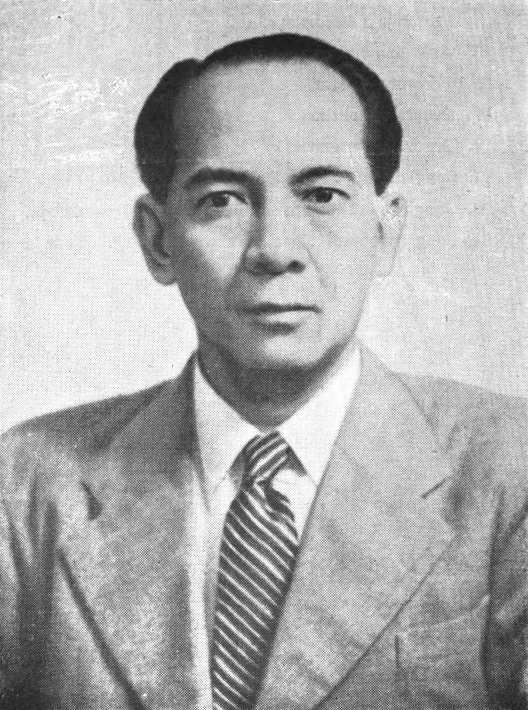
- Official portrait, c. 1954

9th Minister of Justice
- In office 30 Juli 1953 – 12 Agustus 1955
- Prime Minister: Ali Sastroamidjojo
- Preceded by: Lukman Wiriadinata
- Succeeded by: Lukman Wiriadinata

Personal details
- Born: 7 July 1912 Yogyakarta, Yogyakarta Sultanate, Dutch East Indies (present-day Special Region of Yogyakarta, Indonesia)
- Died: 1966 (aged 53–54)
- Party: PNI (1946–1950); PRN (1950–1961)
- Education: Rechts Hogeschool (Mr.)

Djody Gondokusumo (7 July 1912 – c. 1966) was an Indonesian politician and lawyer who served as the minister of justice from July 1953 to August 1955. He was also the founder and chairman of the National People's Party (PRN). After leaving office, Djody was arrested on charges of corruption and sentenced to one year in prison by the Supreme Court. However, President Sukarno would reduce his sentence by six months and he was released in 1956. Thereafter, Djody faded into obscurity until his death.

== Early life and education ==
Djody Gondokusumo was born on 7 July 1912 in the city of Yogyakarta, in what was then the Yogyakarta Sultanate, Dutch East Indies (present-day Special Region of Yogyakarta, Indonesia). He graduated from a Hollandsch-Inlandsche School (HIS), and later a Meer Uitgebreid Lager Onderwijs (MULO). Afterwards, he continued his studies at an Algemene Middelbare School (AMS). He attended the Rechts Hogeschool in Batavia, graduating with a Master of Laws degree. While still a student, Djody was active in the Sangkara Muda religious movement and was a member of the Indonesian Students' Association (PPPI).

== Political career ==
During the 1930s, Djody joined the nationalist Parindra political party. He became a member of its youth wing, Surya Wirawan, as well as first vice-chairman of the party. In January 1946, after the Proclamation of Indonesian Independence on 17 August 1945, he joined the re-established Indonesian National Party (PNI) and became chairman of the party's Central Java provincial committee. He was also elected vice-chairman of the PNI, with Ki Sarmidi Mangunsarkoro serving as chairman.

In 1947, Djody—together with Adnan Kapau Gani and Susanto Tirtoprodjo—became responsible for selecting members of the party council during the PNI's second congress. He himself became the party's second vice-chairman, with Gani becoming chairman. Following the PNI's third congress in Yogyakarta, Ki Sarmidi Mangunsarkoro replaced him as vice-chairman. However, Djody remained as a member of the party's leadership council.

At the PNI's fourth congress, Sidik Djojosukarto of the party's radical nationalist wing was elected party chairman. Meanwhile, Djody and another PNI leader, Sjamsuddin Sutan Makmur, grew disgruntled as they lost their positions within the party. As a result, they founded the National People's Party (PRN) (Note: The party was originally known as PNI-Merdeka (Independent PNI or Free PNI) until October 1950.) in July 1950, with Djody holding the position of party chairman. The split was embarrassing to the PNI and caused it to lose 10 members of its parliamentary fraction to the PRN. However, the new PRN lacked organized support and was branded as "capitalistic" and "right-wing" by the PNI.

=== Minister of Justice (1953–1955) ===
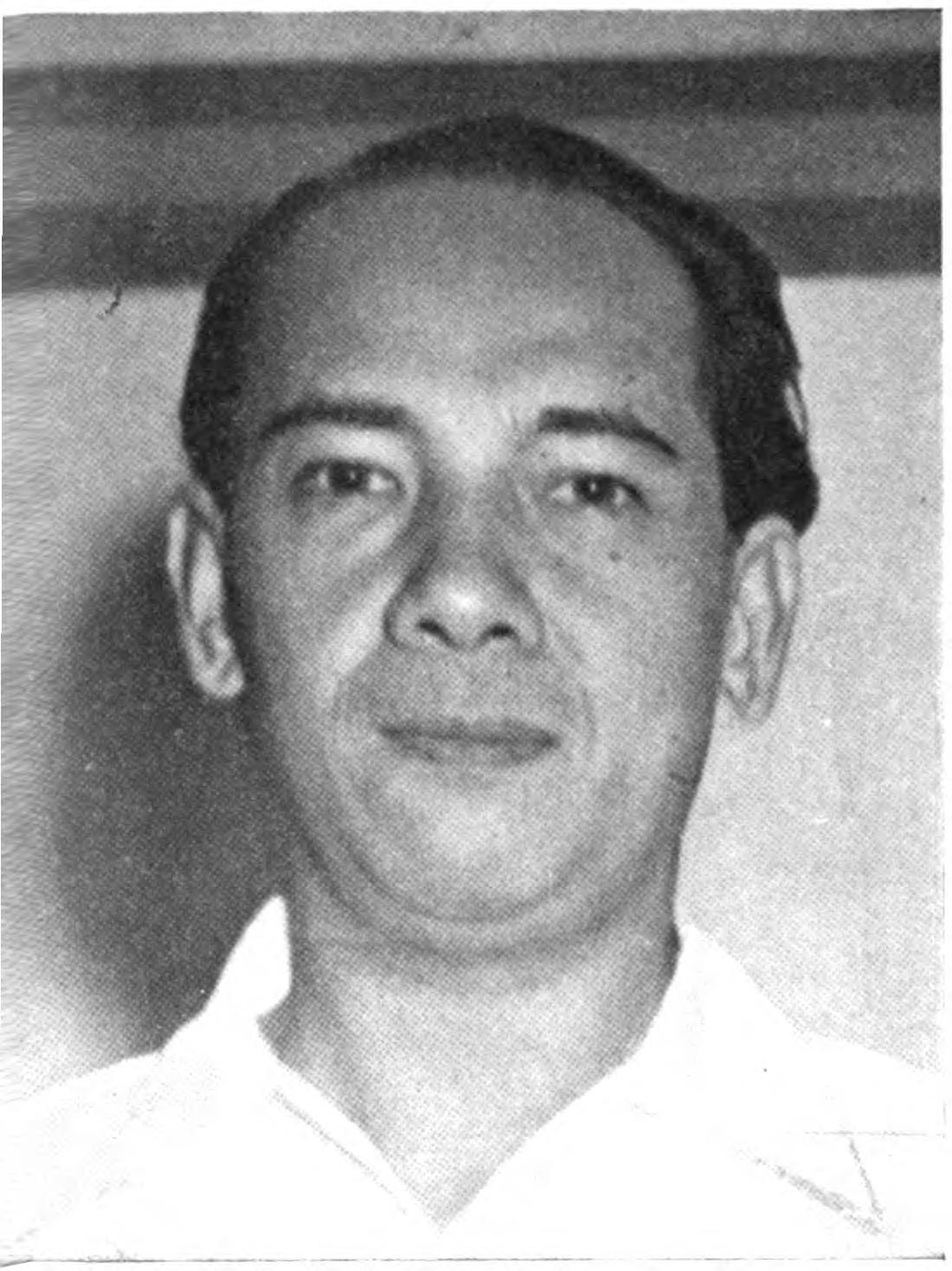
Official portrait, c. 1954

In June 1953, the Wilopo Cabinet resigned following a land dispute in North Sumatra which turned violent. This resulted in a cabinet crisis that lasted for 58 days, only ending when Wongsonegoro was able to cobble up a cabinet led by Ali Sastroamidjojo as prime minister. Within the new cabinet, Djody held the position of justice minister.

As minister of justice, Djody submitted new draft laws to parliament which revised the Herzien Inlandsch Reglement (transl. Revised Indonesian Regulation) and the pre-war law on judicial organization, though they never came to the floor for debate. Meanwhile, he also had to deal with a growing conflict within the judiciary—specifically between judges and prosecutors—over rank, salaries, and prestige. As Djody had recruited several prosecutors into the PRN, he sided with the prosecutors in the dispute. It was later discovered that he didn't pay much attention to the arguments put forward by the judges.

=== Corruption and imprisonment ===
In mid-1955, the cabinet collapsed due to tensions with the Indonesian Army over military appointments, particularly over who should replace Bambang Sugeng as chief of staff. A new cabinet led by Burhanuddin Harahap as prime minister was formed. While Djody didn't return as minister, two PRN members—Frits Laoh and Gunawan—would serve under Burhanuddin. However, on 12 August 1955, he was arrested for corruption at his residence in Menteng by military police. A few hours later, the Attorney General's Office (AGO) would search a house, which Djody frequented, where they found a large amount of money—135 thousand rupiahs—hidden in a safe. On 13 August, the AGO arrested Djody's men at the immigration office, the PRN, and the ministry of justice. At the time, the arrest of a former minister for corruption was unprecedented, though many in the public supported it.

He was accused of extorting foreigners—especially Indian and Chinese people—by charging 100 thousand rupiahs for a travel visa to Indonesia in order to fill up the PRN's coffers for the upcoming 1955 elections. Djody himself denied everything and his defense argued that there was no evidence that Djody received the money. Nevertheless, the justice Satochid Kartanegara of the Supreme Court of Indonesia sentenced him to one year in prison (a year less than what the prosecution had argued for) in January 1956. Around this time, the PRN suffered a split into two factions, that of the mainly Javanese leadership of Djody and the mainly non-Javanese leadership of Bebasa Daeng Lalo. On 20 July 1956, five months into his sentence, President Sukarno reduced it by six months. He left Cipinang Prison—where had served his sentence—in September 1956. Thereafter, he faded into obscurity. When the magazine Tempo reached out to his son about the case decades later, they only received a short answer stating that the matter shouldn't be brought up again. Meanwhile, the PRN would be dissolved in 1961 as Sukarno ordered the dissolution of all but ten parties as part of Indonesia's shift towards Guided Democracy. Gondokusumo died in 1966.

== See also ==
- National People's Party
