= Nerus Ginting Suka =

Indonesian politician

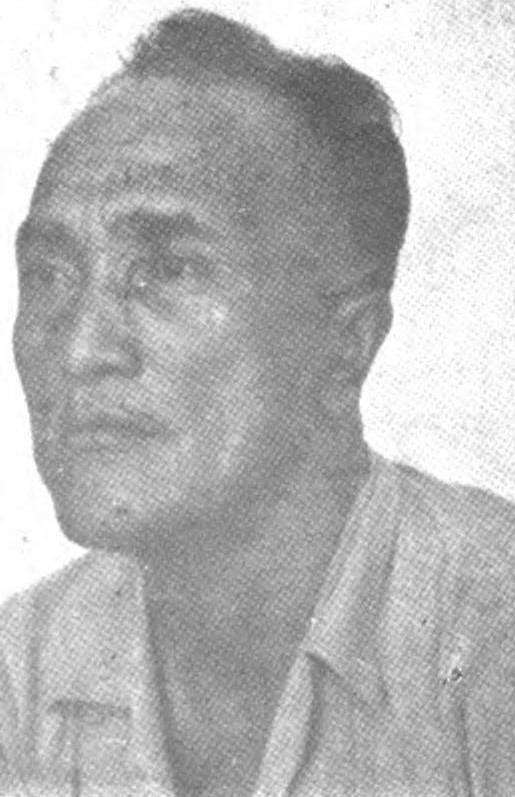

Member of the People's Representative Council
- In office 17 February 1950 – 12 March 1955
- President: Sukarno

Personal details
- Born: 1898 Kabanjahe, East Sumatra, Dutch East Indies
- Died: March 12, 1955 (aged 57) Central Civil Hospital, Jakarta, Indonesia
- Resting place: Medan, North Sumatra, Indonesia
- Party: Indonesian National Party (1930-1931); National People's Party

Nerus Ginting Suka (1898 – 12 March 1955) was a member of the People's Representative Council from 1950 until 1955, and a candidate for the Vice President of Indonesia in the 1950 vice presidential election.

== Early Political Activities ==
From 1920 to 1931, Nerus was active in the Indonesian independence movement. In 1924, he founded the Batak Karo Association and, in 1930, joined the Indonesian National Party. His political activities led to multiple periods of exile in Boven-Digoel.

== Japanese Occupation ==
During the Japanese occupation, he was freed, but later imprisoned again. During this time, he led the recruitment for the Heiho auxiliary soldiers in the Karo area.

== Post Independence Career ==
Following Indonesia, independence, Nerus returned to his hometown of Kabanjahe, in the State of East which at that time was in the Sumatra. In 1947, he was appointed head of information affairs in Berastagi . In 1949, he became a member of the People's Representative Council of the United States of Indonesia, representing East Sumatra. After the dissolution of this parliament, he joined the PrProvisional People's Representative Council as a member of the National People's Party.

== 1950 Vice-Presidential Election ==
On 14 October 1950, Nerus stood as a candidate in the vice-presidential election. He received one vote, reportedly his own.

== Parliamentary Contributions ==
While serving in parliament, Nerus co-sponsored a motion with four members of the Democratic faction. The motion urged the government to give priority to the defense law over the other defenses, which, according to the initiators of the motion, are merely a consequence of the said main law. The motion furthermore calls for the discussion of the 5 bills concerning the army, which are currently being discussed, to be postponed pending the defense law.

== Death and legacy ==
Nerus died on 12 March 1955 at the Central Civil Hospital in Jakarta. and was buried in a public cemetery in Medan. Following his death, Bena Sitepu Pandebesi was appointed as his replacement in the People's Representative Council and was sworn in on 16 June 1955.

== Bibliography ==
- Ministry of Information (1954), Kami Perkenalkan [We Introduce] (PDF) (in Indonesian), Jakarta: Archipel Printers & Editors
