= Provisional House of Representatives =

National legislature of Indonesia from 1950 to 1956

Provisional House of Representatives Dewan Perwakilan Rakyat Sementara

Type
- Type: Unicameral

History
- Established: 16 August 1950
- Disbanded: 26 March 1956
- Preceded by: House of Representatives (United States of Indonesia)
- Succeeded by: House of Representatives

Leadership
- Speaker: Sartono (PNI)
- Deputy Speaker: Albert Mangaratua Tambunan (Parkindo)
- Deputy Speaker: Arudji Kartawinata (PSII)
- Deputy Speaker: Tadjuddin Noor (PIR)

Structure
- Seats: 236 members (1950)
- Authority: Passing laws and budgets (together with the President); oversight on executive branch

Meeting place
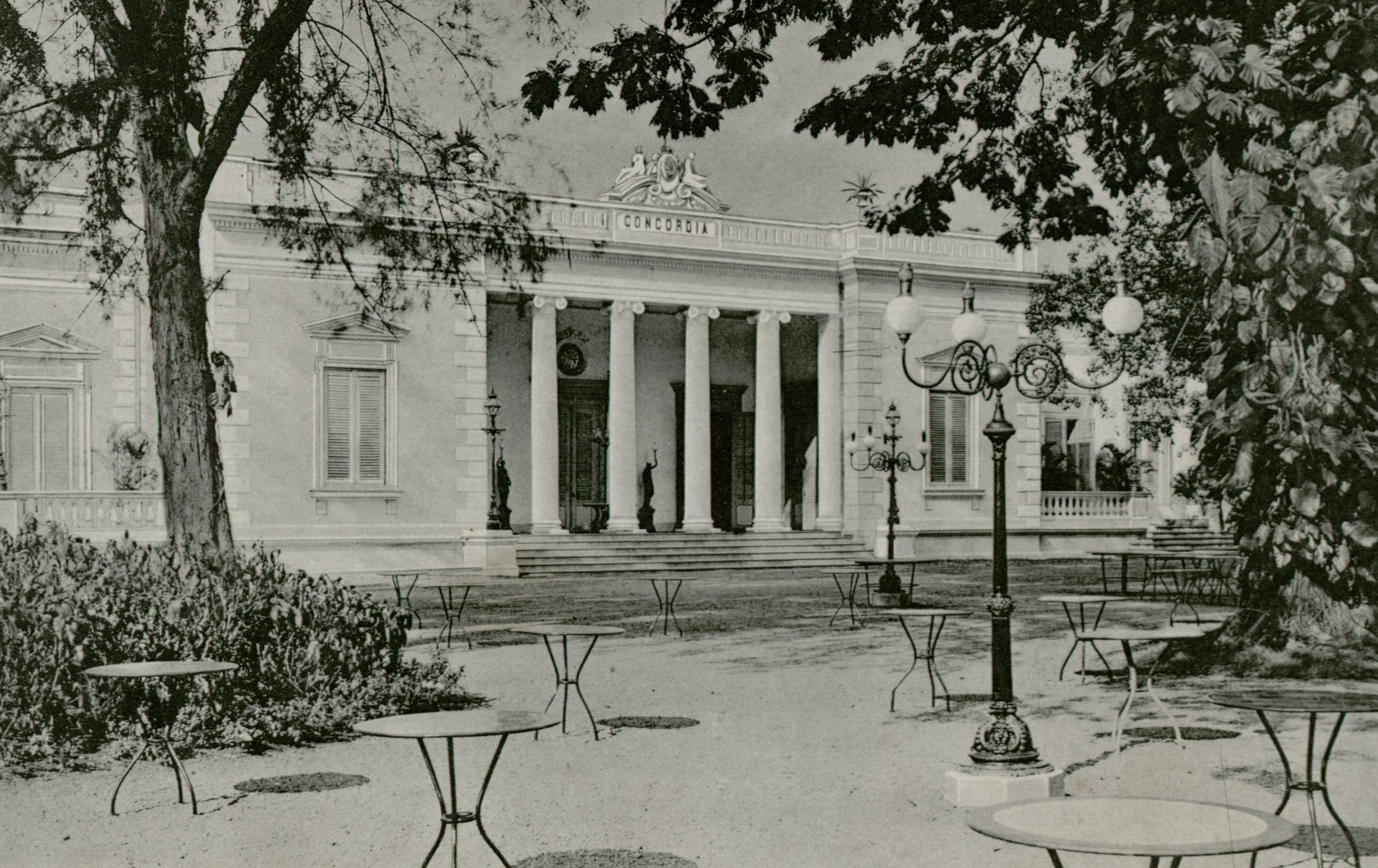
- Sociëteit Concordia Building; Jakarta, Indonesia

Constitution
- Provisional Constitution of 1950

The Provisional House of Representatives (Indonesian: Dewan Perwakilan Rakyat Sementara, DPRS) was the first Indonesian legislature under the Provisional Constitution of 1950. It was formed after the transition of Indonesia to a unitary state on 17 August 1950. The DPRS initially consisted of 236 members, with 213 remaining before it was dissolved in 1956.

== History ==
On 14 August 1950, three days before the dissolution of the United States of Indonesia, the House of Representatives and the Senate of the United States of Indonesia approved the draft of the Provisional Constitution of 1950. Accordingly, on 15 August 1950, the DPRS and the senate held a joint meeting in which Sukarno read the Charter of the Establishment of the Unitary State of the Republic of Indonesia. The charter officially abolished the United States of Indonesia and formed the Republic of Indonesia effective 17 August 1950. Thus, the charter officially dissolved the federal legislative and the senate, and a unicameral legislative for Indonesia was formed.

The second article of the Constitution of the United States of Indonesia, which came into force on 27 December 1949, stated that the "sovereignty of the Republic of Indonesia is vested in the people and is exercised by the government together with the House of Representatives".

Based on this constitution, the speaker of the DPRS, Sartono, held the first session of the House of Representatives at the former Sociëteit Concordia building in Jakarta. After the building was renovated, the building was renamed the Parliament Building. However, the building was not yet ready for use after the opening ceremony. Thus, the meetings of the House of Representatives were held at the upper level of the Hotel des Indes.

== Speaker and deputy speaker ==
Article 62 of the constitution stated that the speaker of the House of Representatives should be elected from and by its members. The speaker should be assisted by several deputy speakers and elected by the same procedure as the speaker. These elections required the confirmation by the President. The constitution also stated that before such confirmation by the president, the oldest member would temporarily preside over the meeting.

Under this rule, Rajiman Wediodiningrat, the oldest member of the DPRS at 71 years of age, was appointed to preside over the parliament's first session, which was to elect the speaker and deputy speaker.

On 19 August 1950, the session to elect the speaker and deputy speaker concluded with Sartono as the speaker and Albert Mangaratua Tambunan, Arudji Kartawinata, and Tadjuddin Noor as the deputy speakers. The president confirmed the results of the election on 21 August 1950.

== Vice-presidential election ==
According to article 45 of the constitution, the president and the vice-president were elected under rules to be laid down by law. Still, for the first time, the president appointed the vice-president upon the recommendation submitted by the House of Representatives. Based on this, the DPRS held an election for the prospective vice-president to be submitted for recommendation on 14 October 1950. Mohammad Hatta won this election and was recommended by the house to be the vice-president of Indonesia.

During the elections, seven MPs from the Communist Party of Indonesia walked out. In a letter to the speaker, these MPs stated that the vice-presidential election was unnecessary.

Candidates	Image	Parties	Votes	%
Mohammad Hatta		Independent	113	76.87
Ki Hajar Dewantara		Independent	19	12.92
Sutan Sjahrir		Socialist Party of Indonesia (PSI)	2	1.36
Soekiman Wirjosandjojo		Masyumi Party	2	1.36
Mohammad Yamin		Independent	2	1.36
Iwa Koesoemasoemantri		Independent	1	0.68
Burhanuddin Harahap		Masyumi Party	1	0.68
Nerus Ginting Suka		National People's Party (PRN)	1	0.68
Abstentions			5	3.40
Invalid votes			1	0.68
Total			147	100
Source: Het nieuwsblad voor Sumatra, 16 October 1950

== Membership ==
=== Requirements ===
Unlike the previous Central Indonesian National Committee, the DPRS had a strict set of provisions regarding the membership. These provisions were drawn up according to Chapters 2 and 3 of the constitution. According to this constitution, members of the House of Representatives had to be at least 25 years old, and their right to vote and be elected must not have been revoked.

=== Composition ===
Article 77 of the Constitution stated that "...the House of Representatives shall for the first time and until it is established by elections in accordance with the law, consist of the chairman, deputy chairmen, and members of the House of Representatives of the United States of Indonesia; the speaker, deputy speaker and members of the Senate; the speaker, deputy speaker and members of the Central Indonesian National Committee and the speaker, deputy speaker, and members of the Supreme Advisory Council. Thus, the DPRS consisted of 148 members from the DPR-RIS, 29 members from the Senate, 46 members from the KNIP, and 13 members from the Supreme Advisory Council.

The constitution did not give the president the authority to add other members, as the government believed it was too difficult to determine the criteria by which such members would be appointed. Several years after the formation of the DPRS, 213 members were remaining, with 23 members having died or resigned. To restore the membership, the government enacted Law No. 37/1953, which provided for the replacement of members who had resigned or died. By the end of 1954, there were 235 members. Muchammad Enoch, a legislator who had resigned from the Parki party, was not replaced by his party, thus leaving one seat empty.

There were 21 factions in the DPRS; 16 consisted of single parties, four consisted of organizations, and one (National Progressive) was a coalition. There were also three short-lived factions: the People's Sovereignty Faction, the Labor Faction, and the Women's Faction. The latter was not actually a faction; it was instead a coalition of seven women MPs. Eleven MPs were not affiliated to any faction.

Composition of the Provisional House of Representatives
Faction	1951 seats	1954 seats
Masyumi	46	43
Indonesian National Party (PNI)	36	42
Great Indonesia Unity Party (PIR)	17	19
Socialist Party of Indonesia (PSI)	17	15
Communist Party of Indonesia (PKI)	13	17
Democratic Fraction	13	9
National People's Party (PRN)	10	13
Progressive Union	-	10
Catholic Party	9	9
Nahdlatul Ulama (NU)	-	8
Parindra	8	7
Labour Party	7	6
Parkindo	7	5
Indonesian Islamic Union Party (PSII)	5	4
Murba Party	4	4
Labour Front	4	-
People's Sovereignty	4	-
Indonesian Democratic Union (SKI)	3	4
Central All-Indonesian Workers Organization (SOBSI)	-	2
Peasant Group	2	-
Peasants Front of Indonesia (BTI)	-	2
Indonesian Peasants' Movement (GTI)	-	1
Islamic Education Movement (Perti)	-	1
Non-faction	26	11
Total	232	235

== See also ==
- Constitutional Assembly of Indonesia

== Bibliography ==
- Djuana, Mohammad; Sulwan (1956), Tata-negara Indonesia [Government of Indonesia] (in Indonesian), Jakarta: Groningen
- Feith, Herbert (2008) [1962]. The Decline of Constitutional Democracy in Indonesia. Singapore: Equininox Publishing (Asia) Pte Ltd. ISBN 978-979-3780-45-0.
- Syatria, Hilmi, ed. (1995). Gedung MPR/DPR RI: Sejarah dan Perkembangannya [MPR/DPR RI Building: History and Development] (PDF) (in Indonesian). Jakarta: Tim Panitia Penerbitan Buku Gedung MPR/DPR RI. ISBN 979-8776-003.
- Tim Penyusun Sejarah (1970), Seperempat Abad Dewan Perwakilan Rakyat Republik Indonesia [A Quarter Century of the House of Representatives of the Republic of Indonesia] (PDF) (in Indonesian), Jakarta: Sekretariat DPR-GR
