= Party of the People =

Party of the People may refer to:

- Party of the People (Burundi)
- Party of the People (Chile)
- Party of the People of Free Indonesia
- Partido de la Gente (Party of the People), Uruguay

== See also ==
- People's Party (disambiguation)
