= Fraction of Upholders of the Proclamation =

Parliamentary group in Indonesia

The Fraction of Upholders of the Proclamation was a parliamentary group in the Indonesian People's Representative Council, formed after the 1955 parliamentary election. The group included ten Members of Parliament. The group was politically heterogenous, but was somewhat pro-Masjumi/Socialist Party of Indonesia.

Members:

- League of Supporters of Indonesian Independence (IPKI)
- Labour Party (Partai Buruh)
- Indonesian People's Party (PRI)
- Village People's Party (PRD)
- Party of the People of Free Indonesia (PRIM).
