= House of Representatives of the United States of Indonesia =

Legislative assembly in the United States of Indonesia

House of Representatives Dewan Perwakilan Rakyat

Type
- Type: Lower house

History
- Established: 15 February 1950
- Disbanded: 16 August 1950
- Preceded by: Central Indonesian National Committee
- Succeeded by: Provisional House of Representatives

Leadership
- Speaker: Sartono (PNI)
- Deputy Speaker: Albert Mangaratua Tambunan (Parkindo)
- Deputy Speaker: Arudji Kartawinata (PSII)

Structure
- Seats: 150 members (1950)
- Authority: Passing laws and budgets (together with the President); oversight on executive branch

Meeting place
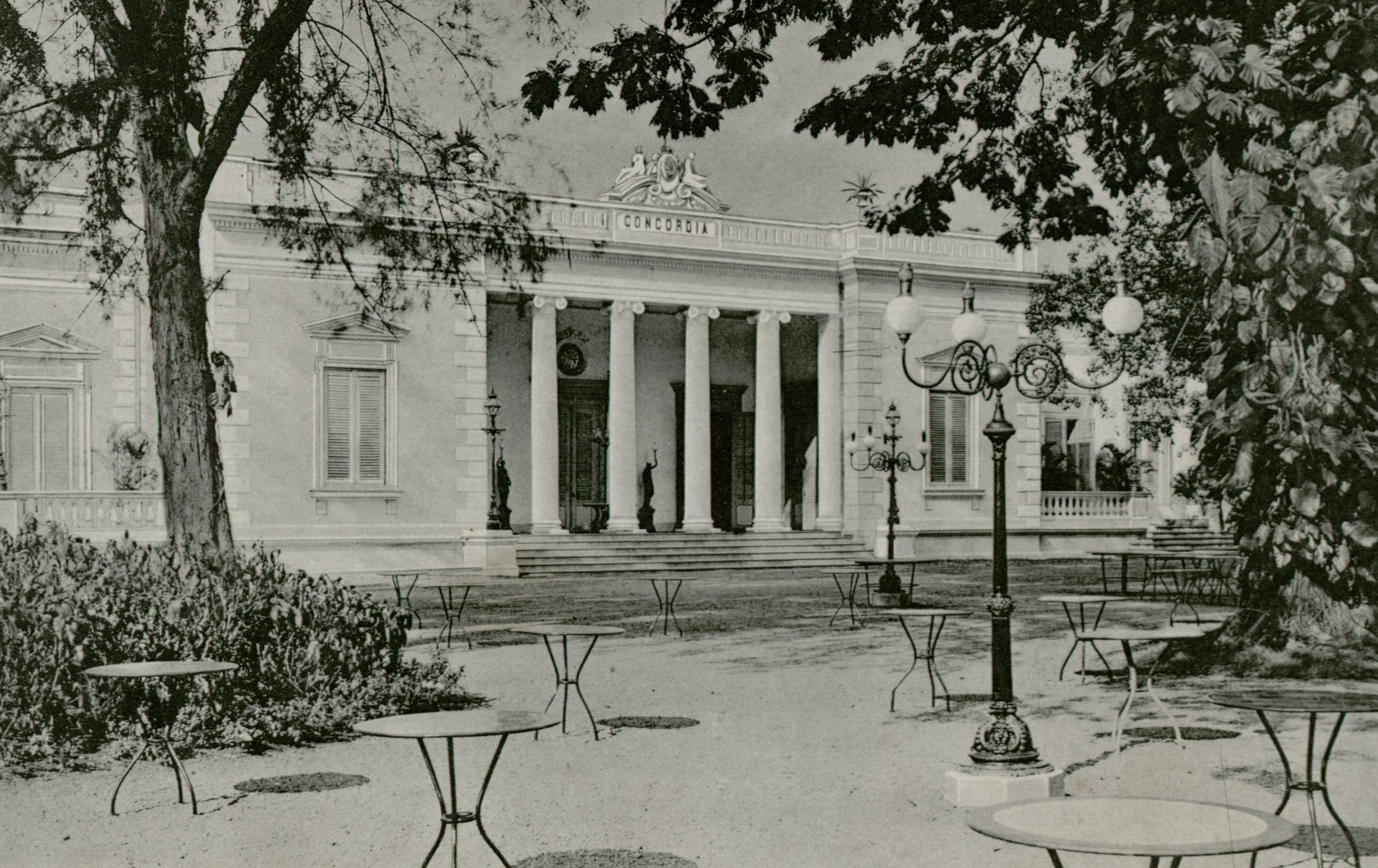
- Sociëteit Concordia Building; Jakarta, Indonesia

Constitution
- Federal Constitution of 1949

The House of Representatives of the United States of Indonesia (Indonesian: Dewan Perwakilan Rakyat Republik Indonesia Serikat, DPR-RIS) was one of the two national legislative assemblies in the United States of Indonesia (RUSI). The council was formed after the establishment of the Indonesian federal state, consisting of 150 members.

The council exercised legislative power with the government and the Senate of the Republic of Indonesia as long as the law material concerned one or all states or regions, or related to the relationship of the RUSI with that state or region. The drafting of laws concerning all powers outside of this was carried out by the President together with the DPR.

== History ==
With the recognition of the sovereignty of Indonesia on 27 December 1949, the Republic of Indonesia was included in the United States of Indonesia, which comprised all the territory of the former Dutch East Indies with the exception of Netherlands New Guinea, sovereignty over which it was agreed would be retained by the Netherlands until further negotiations with Indonesia.

The Constitution of the United States of Indonesia came into force on 27 December 1949. In its first article, the constitution stated that the sovereignty of Indonesia shall be implemented together with the House of Representatives and the Senate.

Based on this constitution, the speaker of the council, Sartono, presided over the first session of the House of Representatives at the Sociëteit Concordia Building on Jalan Wahidin, now the site of a Ministry of Finance Building. After the building was renovated, it was renamed the Parliament Building. However, after the opening ceremony, the building was still not yet fit for use. Therefore, for two weeks, the meetings of the House of Representatives were held on the upper level of the Hotel des Indes. The Loge Ad Huc Stat building (now the Bappenas building) was also used, but the majority of sessions were held in the Parliament Building.

== Speaker and Deputy Speaker ==
The election for the speaker and deputy speaker of DPR was held on 21 February 1950, with Sartono, Albert Mangaratua Tambunan, and Mohammad Yamin as the candidates for the speaker. Sartono came out as the winner of the election, and he was elected as the speaker of the House of Representatives.

Candidates	Parties	1st round	2nd round	3rd round
Sartono	Indonesian National Party	36	48	51
Mohammad Yamin	Independent	30	40	39
Albert Mangaratua Tambunan	Indonesian Christian Party	29	10	
Source: Het nieuwsblad voor Sumatra, 22 February 1950

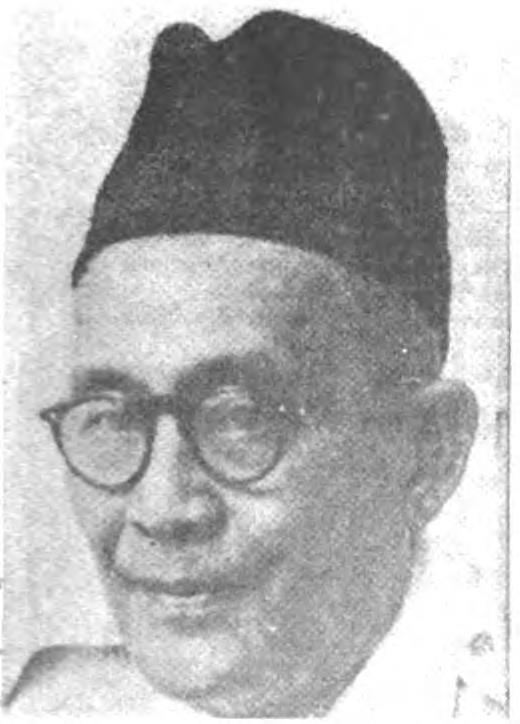
Sonda Daeng Mattajang

The next election for the two deputy speakers was held on 22 February 1950. The position for the first deputy speaker was contested between two candidates, Albert Mangaratua Tambunan and Johannes Latuharhary, while the position for the second deputy speaker was contested by a single candidate, Arudji Kartawinata. Tambunan came out as the winner of the election, and together with Kartawinata. They were elected as the deputy speakers of the council.

Candidates	Parties	1st round
Albert Mangaratua Tambunan	Indonesian Christian Party	70
Johannes Latuharhary	Indonesian National Party	23
Source: Tim Penyusun Sejarah 1970, p. 98

After the election, the council held a ceremonial session to inaugurate the speaker and deputy speaker. The meeting was led by the oldest member of the council at that time, Sonda Daeng Mattajang. At the meeting, President Sukarno inaugurated Sartono, Tambunan, and Latuharhary as the speaker and deputy speakers.

== Membership ==
=== Requirements ===
Unlike the previous Central Indonesian National Committee, the council had a strict set of provisions regarding the membership of the council, which were up according to Article 101 the constitution. This stated that members of the House of Representatives shall be at least 25 years old and have never had his or right of election revoked.

=== Composition ===
The constitution stipulated that the House of Representatives shall consist of 150 members of regional representatives (50 from the Republic of Indonesia and 100 from other states), and 18 members representing minorities (9 representing Chinese Indonesians, 6 representing Arab Indonesians, and 3 representing Indos). The number of members from the components of the United States of Indonesia was based on the population. The regional representative members were appointed through deliberation by the executives of their corresponding states, and later the members would be appointed by a general election which was planned to be held in 1951.

In reality, prior to the dissolution of the parliament, the membership of the council consisted of 150 members, with 146 regional representatives (49 from the Republic of Indonesia and 97 from other states), and 4 representing minorities, all of who were Indos, thus violating the constitution. The actual membership of the council was slightly fewer as 4 members were not inaugurated, 2 members died in office, one resigned and one member had problems relating to citizenship.

There were also problems regarding to the 21 legislators from the State of Pasundan. They were appointed by the Parliament of Pasundan, but a coalition of 16 organizations and political parties from Pasundan rejected their appointment. The RUSI Commisariat for the State of Pasundan responded by cancelling the membership of the representatives on 14 February 1950. The problems were finally resolved on 15 August 1950, a day before the Parliament was dissolved.

Even though the members were representing their respective regions, several members were affiliated to political parties. This led to political parties forming factions for their members. For example, the Masyumi Party formed a faction on 7 March 1950, consisting of 21 members headed by Soekiman Wirjosandjojo, and the Indonesian National Party formed a faction on 13 March 1950, consisting of 23 members headed by Sujono Hadinoto.

== Work accomplished ==
In its seven months, the DPR-RIS passed seven laws, including Law No. 7/1950 replacing the RUSI Constitution with the constitution of the Unitary State. Three of these were replacing emergency legislation issued by the government.

== Bibliography ==
- Djuana, Mohammad; Sulwan (1956), Tata-negara Indonesia:dengan bagian-umum (Government of Indonesia) (in Indonesian), Jakarta: Groningen
- Hilmi Syatria (Ed) (1995), Gedung MPR/DPR RI: Sejarah dan Perkembangannya [MPR/DPR RI Building: History and Development] (PDF) (in Indonesian), Jakarta: Tim Panitia Penerbitan Buku Gedung MPR/DPR RI, ISBN 979-8776-003, archived from the original (PDF) on 2020-01-10
- Kahin, George McTurnan (1952). Nationalism and Revolution in Indonesia. Ithaca, New York: Cornell University Press.
- Ricklefs, M.C. (2008) [1981], A History of Modern Indonesia Since c. 1200 (4th ed.), Palgrave MacMillan, ISBN 978-0-230-54686-8
- Tim Penyusun Sejarah (1970), Seperempat Abad Dewan Perwakilan Rakyat Republik Indonesia [A Quarter Century of the House of Representatives of the Republic of Indonesia] (PDF) (in Indonesian), Jakarta: Sekretariat DPR-GR, archived from the original (PDF) on 2023-04-07
- Pamungkas, Sri Bintang, ed. (1999). Konstitusi Kita dan Rancangan UUD45 Yang Disempurnakan (in Indonesian). Jakarta: Partai Uni Demokrasi Indonesia.
