= Village People's Union =

Political party in Indonesia

Semar, the PRD election symbol

The Village People's Union (Indonesian: Persatuan Rakjat Desa, PRD) was a political party in Indonesia. The party was based amongst the Sundanese population in West Java. In the 1955 parliamentary election, PRD got 77,919 votes (0.2% of the national vote). One parliamentarian was elected from the party. After the election the party joined the Fraction of Upholders of the Proclamation, a heterogenous parliamentary group with ten MPs.
