= Indonesian Peasants Party =

The Indonesian Peasants Party (Indonesian: Partai Tani Indonesia) was a political party in Indonesia. The party was founded in December 1945 in Purwakarta. The party was mainly based in West Java.

The party joined the Consultative Body of Political Parties (BPP) in March 1951.

In the 1955 Constituent Assembly election, the party obtained 30,060 votes and one seat in the assembly.
