= Iskandar Tedjasukmana =

Indonesian Minister of Labor (1915–1981)

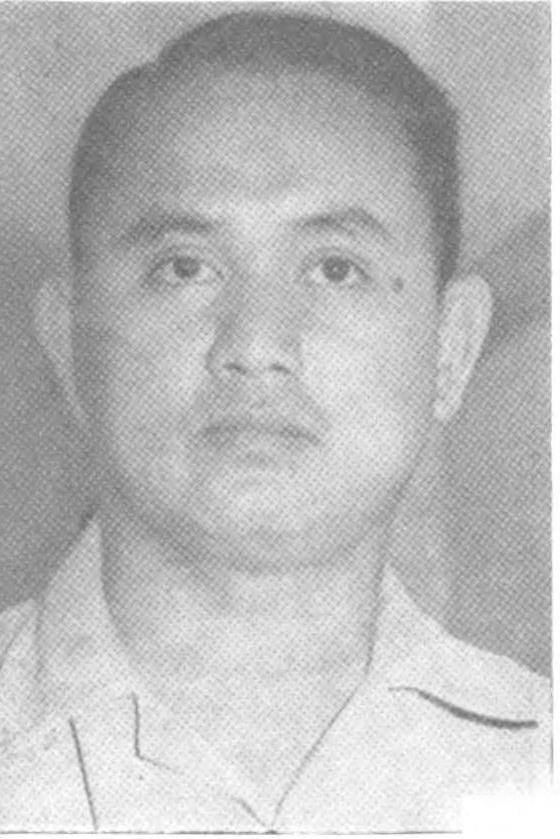

5th Minister of Labor
- In office 27 April 1951 – 30 July 1953
- President: Sukarno
- Prime Minister: Soekiman Wirjosandjojo; Wilopo
- Preceded by: Soeroso
- Succeeded by: Sutan Muchtar Abidin

Personal details
- Born: 22 July 1915 Cianjur, Dutch East Indies
- Died: 30 October 1981 (aged 66) Jakarta, Indonesia
- Party: Labour Party
- Education: Cornell University

Iskandar Tedjasukmana (22 July 1915 – 30 October 1981) was a former Minister of Labor from 1951 to 1953. He was a teacher and judge.

== Early life and education ==
Tedjasukmana was born in Cianjur 22 July 1915. He finished his elementary education at HIS Cianjur. He continued his high school in Jakarta at MULO and AMS B and graduated in 1936. Afterwards, Tedjasukmana enrolled in the law school, Rechtshoogeschool te Batavia from 1936 to 1937.

== Career ==
Tedjasukmana began his career by becoming a teacher at an Islamic school, Normal Islam School in Padang from 1937 to 1938. During the Japanese Occupation era, he worked at the Ministry of Law in Bukittinggi from 1942 to 1945.

After the Proclamation of Indonesian Independence, Tedjasukmana worked in various positions. From 1945 to 1946, he became the Associates Chief Justice of the district court and a member of the Indonesian National Committee Bukittinggi. Afterward, he was appointed as the vice mayor of Buktittinggi from 1947 to 1950. As a vice mayor, he held two positions: member of the West Sumatra Executive Agency and Central Indonesian National Committee. In 1949, he joined a group that opposed the merging of Labour Party of Indonesia to Communist Party of Indonesia. This group founded Labour Party.

As the United States of Indonesia was founded, he became a temporary People's Representative Council member from 1950 to 1951.

== Minister of Labor ==
Tedjakusuma was appointed as a labor minister from 1951 to 1953 under two different prime ministers. During his two-year tenure, he issued a controversial policy, Emergency Act No. 15/1951, that banned labor strikes. After the enactment of the emergency law, he created an advisory council for employment, aiming to give advice on employment mediation, labor distribution, labor expansion, vocational training for workers, and career guidance. Besides, he established the Women's Labor Social Committee in 1951. He also served as the chairman of the Labour Party's political bureau from 1951 to 1956.

== Post-ministership ==
Tedjasukmana was the candidate for People's Representative Council from Labour Party on 1955 Indonesian Constitutional Assembly election. In 1958, he authored a book titled "The Political Character of the Indonesian Trade Union Movement." He finished his dissertation at Cornell University in 1961 with the title of "The Development of Labor Policy and Legislation in the Republic." He then served as the Chairman of the Indonesian Management Institute and also Deputy Chairman of the Indonesian Labor Foundation.

== Personal life ==
Tedjakusuma was married to a Minangkabau woman and had five children. He died on 30 October 1981 in Gatot Soebroto Army Hospital due to heart attack and was buried in Tanah Kusir Cemetery. His grandson, Jason Tedjasukmana, is the Head of Corporate Communications at Google Indonesia (2016–present).
