= Consultative Body of Political Parties =

Political party group in Indonesia

The Consultative Body of Political Parties (Indonesian: Badan Permusjawaratan Partai-Partai, BPP) was a loose coalition of political parties in Indonesia. A preparatory meeting, which would lead to the formation of BPP, was held on 27 February 1951. The BPP was officially launched on March 31, 1951, and a Common Programme adopted. The BPP Common Programme was broadly nationalist. It called for an independent Indonesian foreign policy, and a break from the Round Table Conference agreement. Moreover, it called for the lifting of the state of War, nationalization of key industries, release of political prisoners, land reform, the right to strike, swift holding of elections and the return of West Irian (West Papua) to Indonesia.

The BPP had eleven members, such as the Communist Party of Indonesia (Partai Komunis Indonesia), Islamic Education Movement (Perti), Indonesian Marhaen People's Union (Permai), Indonesian Islamic Union Party (Partai Sarekat Islam Indonesia), Labour Party (Partai Buruh), Murba Party (Partai Murba), Indonesian Peasants Party (Partai Tani Indonesia), National People's Party (Partai Rakjat Nasional), Greater Indonesia Party (Parindra) and Indo-Europeans Nationalist Party (Partai Indo Nasional).

Initially it appeared that the BPP would provide a venue for the Communist Party of Indonesia broad cooperation with the Indonesian Nationalist Party (PNI). However, as the PNI eventually rejected the invitation to join the BPP, the coalition rapidly became non-effective. The Communist Party on its hand continued to refer to the BPP Common Programme as the basis of its united front work, even after the BPP had ceased to function.
