= Party of the People of Free Indonesia =

Political party in Indonesia

Party of the People of Free Indonesia (Indonesian: Partai Rakyat Indonesia Merdeka, PRIM) was a political party in Indonesia. The party was based amongst the Sundanese population in West Java. In the 1955 parliamentary election, PRIM got 72,523 votes (0.2% of the national vote). One parliamentarian was elected from the party. After the election the party joined the Fraction of Upholders of the Proclamation, a heterogenous parliamentary group with ten MPs.
