= National People's Party (Indonesia) =

Political party in Indonesia (1950–1961)

National People's Party Partai Rakyat Nasional
- Abbreviation: PRN
- Chairman: Djody Gondokusumo
- Secretary-General: Maridie Danukusumo
- Founded: 23 July 1950
- Dissolved: 14 April 1961
- Split from: Indonesian National Party
- Women's wing: Wanita Nasional ("National Women")
- Ideology: Democracy; Nationalism

Election symbol
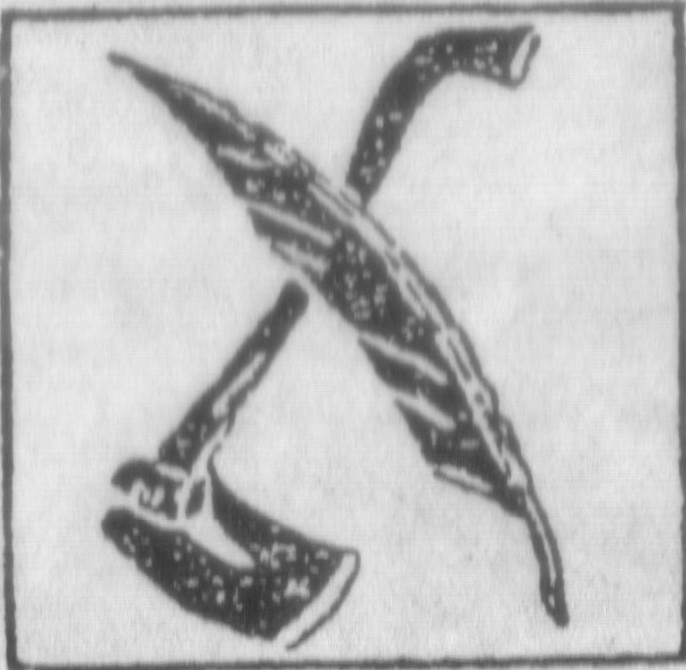

The National People's Party (Indonesian: Partai Rakjat Nasional, abbr. PRN), (Note: Spelling based on the Republican Spelling System in use from 1947 until 1972. In modern Indonesian orthography, the word Rakjat would be spelled as Rakyat.) initially founded as the Indonesian National Party–Independent (Indonesian: Partai Nasional Indonesia–Merdeka, PNI–M), was a political party in Indonesia. It was founded on 23 July 1950 after a split within the Indonesian National Party (PNI). The divisions with the PNI had appeared at the party congress in May the same year, when Sidik Djojosukarto's followers (whom the founders of PNI-Merdeka/PRN opposed) had emerged victorious (after the split the PNI labelled the PRN as 'right-wing' and 'capitalistic'). Djody Gondokusumo was the chairman of the party.

When the People's Representative Council was established following the dissolution of the United States of Indonesia and the establishment of Indonesia as a unitary state, the PRN was given 10 legislative seats. In October 1950, the PRN was the only non-government party to support the Natsir cabinet when a vote of confidence was held in parliament. Later in the same month, the party adopted the name PRN.

As of 1951 the party claimed to have two million members, although that figure was probably highly inflated.

In March 1951 the party joined ten other parties, including the Communist Party of Indonesia (PKI), in the Consultative Body of Political Parties, a nationalist coalition established as form for the PKI and the Indonesian National Party (PNI) to work together. However, the PNI refused to join the body, making it ineffective.

When the first Ali Sastroamidjojo cabinet was formed in 1953, the PRN leader Dr. Djody Gondokusumo was named Minister of Justice. In November 1953 he was joined by the PRN politician I Gusti Gde Rake, who became Minister of Agrarian Affairs.

In the 1955 parliamentary election, the PRN gained 242,125 votes (0.64% of the national vote), and was awarded two seats in the 257-seat parliament. The PRN joined the National Progressive Fraction, a body of ten MPs from Java. In the Constitutional Assembly election held later the same year, it won 220.652 votes (0.58%), resulting in 3 seats in the 514-seat Constitutional Assembly.

In 1956 the party suffered a split, as there was a division between the Javanese leadership (loyal to Dr. Gondokusumo) and a group of non-Javanese leaders (a headed by Bebasa Daeng Lalo). The Bebasa Daeng Lalo-faction counted on the support of two PRN ministers in the Burhanuddin Harahap cabinet, F. Laoh and Gunawan.

In late 1956 the PRN expressed support for President Sukarno's konsepsi, which would lead to the establishment of the Guided Democracy. However, in January 1960 a new law came into effect that placed severe restrictions on the ideology, conduct and membership of political parties. The PRN failed to meet these requirements, and was dissolved along with all but ten of Indonesian's political parties.

== Women's wing ==
The women's wing of PRN was known as Wanita Nasional ('National Woman'). By 1960, the organization claimed to have 90 branches.

== Election results ==
=== House of Representatives ===
Election	Leader	Seats	Votes	%	Ref.
1955	Djody Gondokusumo	2 / 257	242,125	0.64%	

=== Constitutional Assembly ===
Election	Leader	Seats	Votes	%	Ref.
1955	Djody Gondokusumo	3 / 514	220,652	0.58%	
