= President Sukarno's 1959 Decree =

1959 order by Indonesian Pres. Sukarno which re-adopted the 1945 constitution

Presidential Decree of July 5, 1959
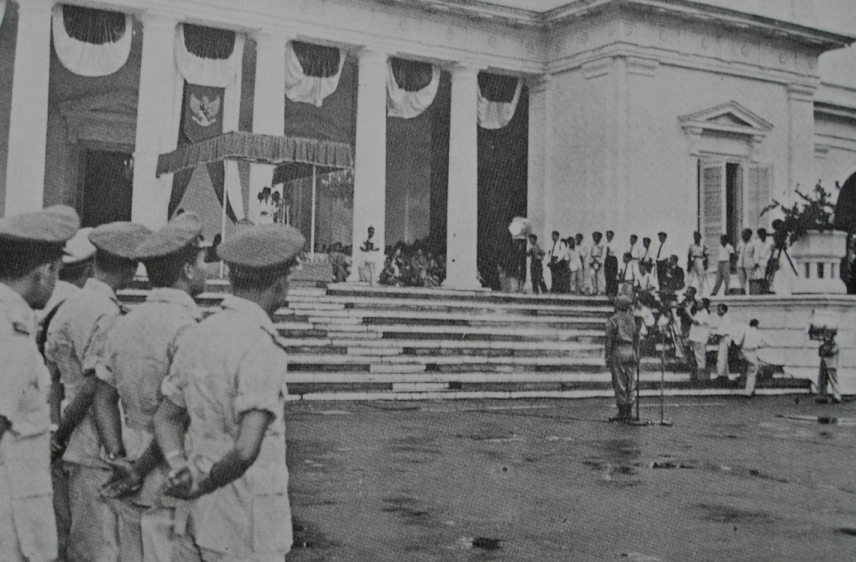
- President Sukarno, partly obscured, at top of steps, reading the decree
- Date: 5 July 1959; 67 years ago
- Location: Merdeka Palace, Jakarta
- Participants: Sukarno (1st President of Indonesia)
- Outcome: Dissolution of the Liberal democracy government: Abrogation of the Provisional Constitution of 1950; Re-adoption of the 1945 Constitution; Dissolution of the Constitutional Assembly

The Presidential Decree of 5 July 1959 (legally the Decree of the President of the Republic of Indonesia Number 150 of 1959 on the Return to the Constitution of 1945, Indonesian: Keputusan Presiden Nomor 150 Tahun 1959 tentang Kembali kepada Undang-Undang Dasar 1945) was issued by President Sukarno in the face of the inability of the Constitutional Assembly of Indonesia to achieve the two-thirds majority to reimpose the 1945 Constitution. It was army chief of staff Abdul Haris Nasution who concluded that this would be the only way to bring about the reintroduction of a constitution that paved the way for the military to play a greater role in the running of the state, ushering in the period known as the "guided democracy" (1959–1966).

== The Decree ==
The decree, which was read by Sukarno at the Merdeka Palace reads as follows:

DECREE OF THE PRESIDENT OF THE REPUBLIC OF INDONESIA
AND COMMANDER-IN-CHIEF OF THE NATIONAL ARMED FORCES
On the official reintroduction of the 1945 State Constitution of the Republic of Indonesia

With the Mercy of Almighty God
WE THE PRESIDENT OF THE REPUBLIC OF INDONESIA/COMMANDER IN CHIEF OF THE NATIONAL ARMED FORCES

Hereby declare with respect:
That the proposal of the President and Government to return to the 1945 Constitution as conveyed to the entire Indonesian people with the mandate of the President dated April 22nd, 1959 did not result in a decision from the Constitutional Assembly as stipulated by the Provisional Constitution;
That with the declaration of the majority of the members of the Session to Produce a Constitution to no longer attend sessions, it is no longer possible for the Constitutional Assembly to complete the task entrusted to it by the people;
That this has resulted in a situation that endangers the unity and security of the Nation, Land and People, as well as hampering overall development toward a just and prosperous society;
That with the support of the majority of the Indonesian people and urged on by our own certainty, we are forced to follow the only path to save the Proclaimed Nation:
That we are certain that the Jakarta Charter dated July 22nd, 1945 inspired the 1945 Constitution and is part of the chain of unity with the aforementioned Constitution.
Therefore, based on the above,

WE THE PRESIDENT OF THE REPUBLIC OF INDONESIA/COMMANDER IN CHIEF OF THE NATIONAL ARMED FORCES:

Resolve thus to order the dissolution of the Constituent Assembly,
Resolve that the 1945 Constitution is once again in force for the entire Indonesian people and the entire Indonesian nation, as from the date of the enactment of this decree and that the Provisional Constitution is no longer in force within the Republic,
Resolve to order the establishment of a Provisional People's Consultative Assembly, which is made up of the members of the House of Representatives with the delegates from the regions and groups, with the establishment of a Provisional Supreme Advisory Council to be organized as speedily as possible, in keeping with the provisions of the aforementioned Constitution.

Resolved in Jakarta
on July 5th, 1959

In the name of the People of Indonesia:

President of the Republic of Indonesia/Commander in Chief of the National Armed Forces

[signed.] SOEKARNO

== Aftermath ==
After Sukarno enacted the decree, he dissolved the Constitutional Assembly by abrogating the 1950 Provisional Constitution. This decree caused the cabinet to be directly led by the President.
