= Labour Party (Indonesia, 1949) =

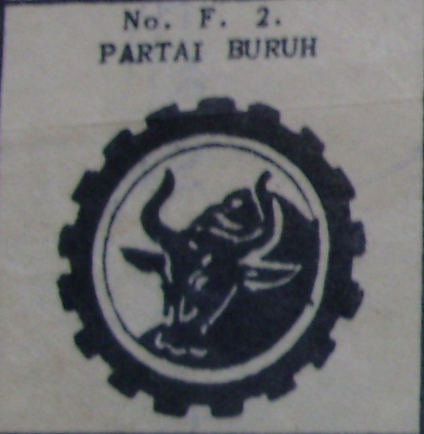
- Chairman: Iskandar Tedjasukmana
- Founded: 25 December 1949
- Dissolved: 1956 or later.
- Split from: Labour Party of Indonesia
- Ideology: Marxism; Nationalism
- Political position: Left-wing

The Labour Party (Indonesian: Partai Buruh) was a political party in Indonesia. It was formed on 25 December 1949 by a group of former Labour Party of Indonesia (PBI) members, who had disagreed with the merger of PBI into the Communist Party of Indonesia.

The party had a degree of influence, as it counted on support from trade unions and had influence inside the Ministry of Labour. Iskandar Tedjasukmana was the Chairman of the Political Bureau of the party between 1951 and 1956. Iskandar Tedjasukmana represented the party in government, serving as Minister of Labour in the Sukiman, Wilopo and Burhanuddin Harahap cabinets (1951–1956).

The party was officially Marxist, but in political practice more influenced by nationalism. Inside the party leadership, there was a division between those who supported the 'oppositionist' positions of the Indonesian National Party and Murba Party, and another sector of intellectuals who were closer to the Socialist Party of Indonesia.

When the People's Representative Council (DPR) was formed in 1950, seven of its 236 members belonged to the Labour Party. As of 1951, the Labour Party claimed to have 60,000 members. In March 1951, the party was one of eleven parties that formed the Consultative Body of Political Parties (BPP).

In 1952 trade unionists linked to the Labour Party founded the Himpunan Serikat-Serikat Buruh Indonesia trade union centre. The president of HISSBI A.M. Fatah was a Labour Party member.

The party obtained 224,167 votes in the 1955 legislative election (0.6% of the national vote), and won two seats in the parliament. After the election the party joined the Fraction of Upholders of the Proclamation, a heterogenous parliamentary group with ten MPs.
