= Federal Constitution of 1949 =

1949 Federal Constitution of the United States of Indonesia

Overview
- Jurisdiction: United States of Indonesia
- Created: 29 October 1949
- Ratified: 27 December 1949
- Date effective: 27 December 1949
- System: Federal parliamentary republic
- Federalism: Federation
- Repealed: 17 August 1950
- Signatories: Federal Consultative Assembly; Kingdom of the Netherlands; Republic of Indonesia

The 1949 Federal Constitution of the United States of Indonesia (Indonesian: Konstitusi Republik Indonesia Serikat, lit. 'Constitution of the Republic of the United States of Indonesia') replaced the 1945 Constitution of Indonesia when sovereignty was officially transferred from the Netherlands to Indonesia following the Dutch-Indonesian Round Table Conference. It came into force on 27 December 1949 and was replaced by the Provisional Constitution of 1950 on 17 August 1950.

== Background ==
From the day after the proclamation of Indonesian independence on 17 August 1945, the original Constitution of Indonesia approved by the Preparatory Committee for Indonesian Independence was in force. As the Dutch wanted to retain their colony, the war of independence broke out between Dutch forces and Indonesian republicans. However, following international pressure, negotiations took place leading to the Linggadjati Agreement to establish a federal United States of Indonesia. A constitutional assembly would be established and the Indonesian side would start work on a constitution for the new state. Following the January 1948 Renville Agreement, Dutch and Republican committees both presented drafts.

The Indonesian committee, chaired by Soepomo, produced a document that was very different from the 1945 Constitution as it contained human rights guarantees and provided for a bicameral system of government, with a senate and a lower chamber. By the end of March, the two sides were almost completely in agreement. However, the Republican side wanted a dominant role within the federal state, while the Dutch wanted a greater role for the non-Republic states. In the run up to the Dutch–Indonesian Round Table Conference at which the Dutch would hand over sovereignty to the United States of Indonesia (RUSI), Ide Anak Agung Gde Agung, prime minister of the State of East Indonesia, one of the non-Republic states, invited future RUSI government officials to attend an Inter-Indonesia Conference to agree on a negotiating position. Two such conferences were held, in July and August 1949. The delegates agreed on the basic principles and outline for the Federal Constitution.

== Content ==
The constitution had 197 articles in six main sections:

1. The State of the United States of Indonesia
2. The United States of Indonesia and its Component Regions
3. The instruments of state
4. Administration
5. The Constitutional Assembly
6. Amendments, transitional and final provisions

== Enactment and abrogation ==
The 1949 Federal Constitution came into force with the formal handing over of sovereignty to the newly established United States of Indonesia on 27 December 1949. However, in the following eight months, the various states and autonomous regions dissolved themselves into the largest state, the Republic of Indonesia. On 17 August 1950, the United States of Indonesia was officially dissolved by President Sukarno and replaced by a unitary Republic of Indonesia with a new provisional constitution.
