= Provisional Constitution of 1950 =

Fundamental law of Indonesia from 1950 to 1959

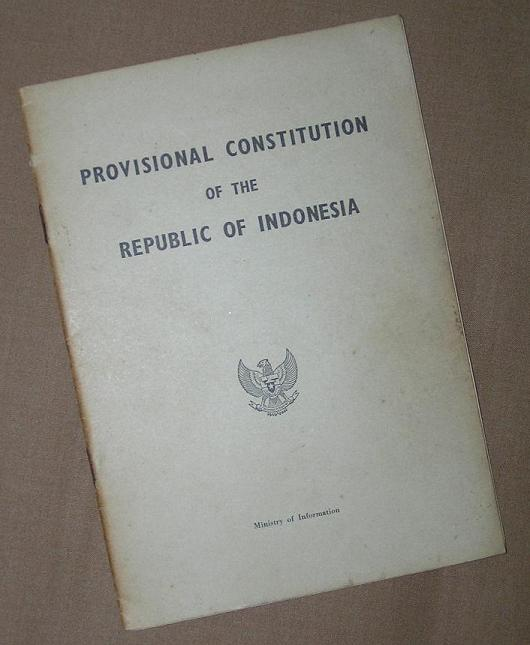
- The official translation of the 1950 provisional Constitution

Overview
- Jurisdiction: Republic of Indonesia
- Created: 14 August 1950
- Ratified: 14 August 1950
- Date effective: 15 August 1950
- System: Unitary parliamentary republic
- Repealed: 5 July 1959
- Provisional Constitution of 1950 at Indonesian Wikisource

The Provisional Constitution of 1950 (Indonesian: Undang-Undang Dasar Sementara Republik Indonesia 1950, UUDS 1950) replaced the Federal Constitution of 1949 when Indonesia unilaterally withdrew from the union with the Netherlands agreed at the Round Table Conference and returned to being a unitary state. It came into force on 15 August 1950. It was abrogated on 5 July 1959 when President Sukarno issued a decree dissolving the Constitutional Assembly and restoring the 1945 Constitution of Indonesia.

== Background ==
On 27 December 1949, following the handover of sovereignty from the Netherlands to the United States of Indonesia (RUSI), the Federal Constitution of 1949 replaced the 1945 Constitution of Indonesia. However over the next few months, there appeared a groundswell of public opinion for a return to a unitary state. By early May 1950, this had become the major priority for the RUSI cabinet led by Prime Minister Mohammad Hatta. On 19 May 1950, Hatta (representing the RUSI and the states of East Indonesia and East Sumatra) and the prime minister of the (constituent) Republic of Indonesia Abdul Halim agreed on a Joint RUSI-Republic of Indonesia Charter, which contained the following points:

- That the new "Republic of Indonesia" would be established as quickly as possible.
- That the constitution of the new state would be a modified version of the 1949 Constitution of the United States of Indonesia.
- That the constitution would contain the provision that "the right to property is a social function".
- That the RUSI Senate would be abolished, while the Provisional House of Representatives would be made up of the RUSI House of Representatives plus the Republic of Indonesia Central Committee (KNIP). Any additional members would be appointed by the president taking into account the views of the government.
- Sukarno would be president of the new state, with the position of vice-president to be considered further.
- That the cabinet would be of parliamentary form.
- That a committee should be established to implement this agreement as quickly as possible.

The two governments further agreed that this provisional constitution would be submitted to both states' parliaments for approval (but not amendment). If that was obtained, a joint session of both parliaments would be held, at which the president would formally inaugurate the unitary state.

== Committee for the Preparation of the Unitary State ==
This committee was formally established immediately after the 19 May agreement. It had 14 members, with seven appointed by each government. It was chaired jointly by the RUSI justice minister Soepomo and the Indonesian Republic's prime minister Abdul Halim. Hatta and Abdul Halim had previously agreed that all the members of the RUSI House of Representatives as well as the republic's legislature would be members of the unicameral parliament, with other members to be appointed by the president. The committee eventually decided that in addition, the members of the RUSI senate and the Supreme Advisory Council of the Republic would also be members, resulting in a 236-member house. The committee also decided that Jakarta would be the capital of the state and that the nation would be divided into 10 provinces and two special regions (Greater Jakarta and Yogyakarta). After two months of deliberations, the committee agreed on a draft constitution, which after some minor changes, was approved by both governments on 20 July. Both parliaments approved it on 14 August, three days ahead of the Independence Day anniversary deadline.

== Provisions of the Constitution ==
Like its predecessor, this constitution would be provisional and would stipulate that a constitutional assembly would produce a definitive document. It provided for a unicameral parliamentary form of government with a cabinet and prime minister held responsible to the parliament and for a President but with no real executive powers.

With a total of 146 articles, the constitution was divided into six main sections:

1. The State of the Republic of Indonesia
2. Instruments of state
3. Functions of the instruments of state
4. Administration of the regions and autonomous regions
5. The Constitutional Assembly
6. Amendments, transitional and final provisions

Key provisions included:

- The right for the government to pass emergency laws, which would remain in force until specifically revoked by parliament
- The right of the president to dissolve the House of Representatives (but which had to be accompanied by a call for elections within 30 days)
- A constituent assembly to be elected by secret ballot. Any constitution would require a two-thirds majority to be approved
- 28 articles on fundamental rights and freedoms covering equality before the law, freedom of movement, a ban on all types of slavery, freedom of religion, freedom of opinion and expression, freedom of assembly and the right to demonstrate and strike. This section was based on the 1948 Universal Declaration of Human Rights

== Abrogation of the Constitution ==
In 1955 elections were held for the Constitutional Assembly, which was tasked with drawing up a permanent constitution. However, after much wrangling, it failed to agree, with the principal issue being the role of Islam in the new state. In July 1958, army chief-of-staff Abdul Haris Nasution suggested returning to the 1945 Constitution. The army organised demonstrations in favour of this, and the idea gained popularity with a number of political parties. After it had failed to obtain the necessary two-thirds majority for such a return, on 5 July, President Sukarno issued a decree dissolving it and restoring the 1945 Constitution of Indonesia.
