= Parada Harahap =

Indonesian journalist (1899–1959)

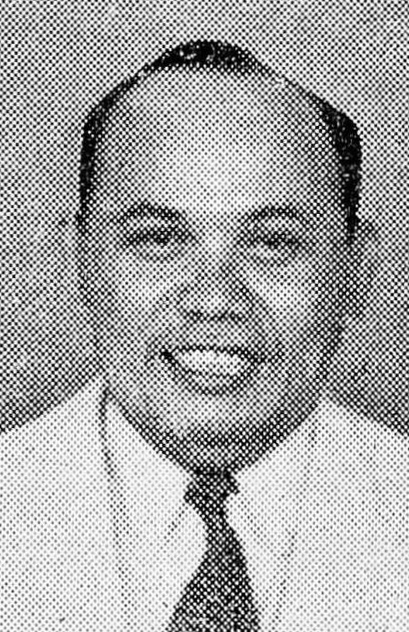
Portrait, c. 1942

Parada Harahap (born 1899 in Sipirok, Dutch East Indies, died 1959 in Jakarta) was an important journalist and writer from the late colonial period and early independence era in Indonesia. In the 1930s, he was called the "king of the Java press". He pioneered a new kind of politically neutral Malay language newspaper in the 1930s which would cater to the rising middle class of the Indies.

== Biography ==
=== Early life ===
Parada was born on December 15, 1899, into a Batak family in Pargarutan, Sipirok, South Tapanuli Regency, Dutch East Indies, now part of North Sumatra province in Indonesia. Although most Batak people are Christians, Harahap was a Muslim Batak. He was largely self-taught and an enthusiastic reader from a young age, mainly reading materials sent to him by his sister who lived in Bukittinggi. However, he did also get a formal education, studying at the Teacher's Training School (Kweekschool) in Bukittinggi. At the age of 15 he became a clerk at a rubber plantation Rubber Cultuur Mij. Amsterdam in the Jambi area of Sumatra. During his teen years he gained an interest in newspapers, subscribing to Pewarta Deli and Andalas, and often writing letters to Soetan Palindoengan, editor of Pewarta Deli.

=== Newspaper career ===
Harahap's career in newspapers started in 1918 when he became editor of Sinar Merdeka in Padang, as well as editor of a Batak language paper in Sibolga called Poestaka. During this time he was also active in the Sarekat Islam in Padang.

In 1922 Harahap relocated from Sumatra to Java. He started as a low-level printing assistant at Sin Po in Batavia. With the recommendation of some Sumatran journalist notables, he then became head editor of a competing paper, Neratja. There, he learned a lot about the business from Abdul Muis, Agus Salim and Djojosoediro. After 9 months there he launched his own newspaper, Bintang Hindia. In 1923 he published Melati van Agam (Jasmine of Java), a romance novel, under the pseudonym Swan Pen. It was adapted to stage in 1923 by Andjar Asmara, then to film in 1930 by Lie Tek Swie and again in 1940 by Tan Tjoei Hock.

He soon expanded his news holdings, founding the wire service Algemene Pers en Nieuws Agentschaap (Alpena). He then founded a series of new papers: Bintang Timoer, Djawa Barat, Sinar Pasundan, Semangat, as well as Dutch-language De Volks Courant. Of those papers, Bintang Timoer, launched in September 1926, quickly became the most successful, not least due to the popular writing of Abdoel Rivai. Even before its first issue, the Dutch language newspaper Algemeen handelsblad voor Nederlandsch-Indië was already recommending it to "the natives" due to Harahap's reputation for hard work and dedication to good journalism. The editorial lineup in the first year, aside from Harahap, were G. Soetadipradja, Kadar, Hatnid and Abdullah Badjrei. The paper noted that Bintang Timoer would be independent of any religious or political faction, and that it had a more modern layout than most Malay language papers, with illustrations and more space given to content. Since the paper was not involving itself in politics, it even promised that while "the importance of Indonesia will be kept in mind, since no party interests are served, Indonesia will be understood as a 'geographical concept' not in the meaning of a 'political concept'." That type of statement symbolizes his attitude in the late 1920s and 1930s, that newspapers are a business not a political movement, and accepting Dutch rule in the Indies rather than using the newspaper to fight it.

During this time Harahap involved himself in Indies journalism in many important ways. In 1924 he translated the Dutch penal code sections about journalism from Dutch into Malay. In 1925 Harahap also helped organize a new association for Asian journalists in the Indies called the Journalistenbond Azie (Associations of Journalists of Asia). Mohammad Tabrani from Hindia Baroe and Kwee Kek Beng from Sin Po were on the executive board, with Wage Rudolf Supratman as chairman.

Bintang Timur, his newspaper, apparently resumed publication in early 1953 after being unable to publish during World War II and the Indonesian National Revolution. Under its new guise in independent Indonesia, Harahap became president-director and head editor, and promised that the paper would have a "national progressive" line and to present the news in a responsible and neutral manner.

In 1956 Harahap was appointed dean of a new college for journalism and political science in Jakarta, the Perguruan Tinggi Ilmu Kewartawanan dan Politik or Akademi Wartawan, supported by the Yayasan Ibnu Chaldun, a foundation run by various Muslim figures in the city.

Harahap died on May 11, 1959, in Jakarta.

== Selected works ==
- Roos van Batavia : atau Gadis terpeladjar jang bebas merdeka (1924)
- Journalistiek (pers- en spreekdelichtenboek) (1924)
- Riwajat Dr. A. Rivai (1939)
- Pers dan journalistiek (1941)
- Vietnam merdeka! (1948)
- Kedudukan pers dalam masjarakat (1951)
- Toradja: Rangkaian Tanah Air (1952) (Indonesian: Toraja: Our land series)
- Indonesia sekarang (1952)
