= Moenasiah =

Moenasiah (born c. 1897) was a Sarekat Islam and Indonesian Communist Party leader active in Semarang, Central Java, Dutch East Indies during the 1920s. She was chairperson of the women's section of the Communist Party for a time in the 1920s. She was exiled by Dutch authorities to Boven-Digoel concentration camp from 1927 to 1930.

== Biography ==
Little is known about Moenasiah's early life. She made her livelihood in Semarang by operating a Warung (roadside food stall).

In the early 1920s she quickly rose to prominence in the Semarang wing of the Sarekat Islam (SI), an Indonesian nationalist organization whose Semarang branch had a strong Left-wing and Communist base. She used her status as a small-time food stall operator to draw attention to the plight of Indonesians working in the market, who were subject to unfair treatment and abuse by police and Europeans. She became vice-president of women’s section of Semarang SI in October 1921 and president in 1922. She was arrested in May 1923 along with other members of the women's committee (Soetitah and Napsiah) for speeches she gave during the VSTP (Rail and Tram worker's union). In 1923 the Semarang branch of the Sarekat Islam distanced itself increasingly from the central body of the organization in Batavia (led by H. O. S. Tjokroaminoto and reorganized itself more explicitly as the Indonesian Communist Party; Moenasiah became vice-chair of the women's section of the new party. Seeing the need for a mass organization like the SI, the Semarang activists also founded a new organization called the Sarekat Ra'jat (people's union), with Moenasiah as chair and Soetitah as vice-chair of the women's section.

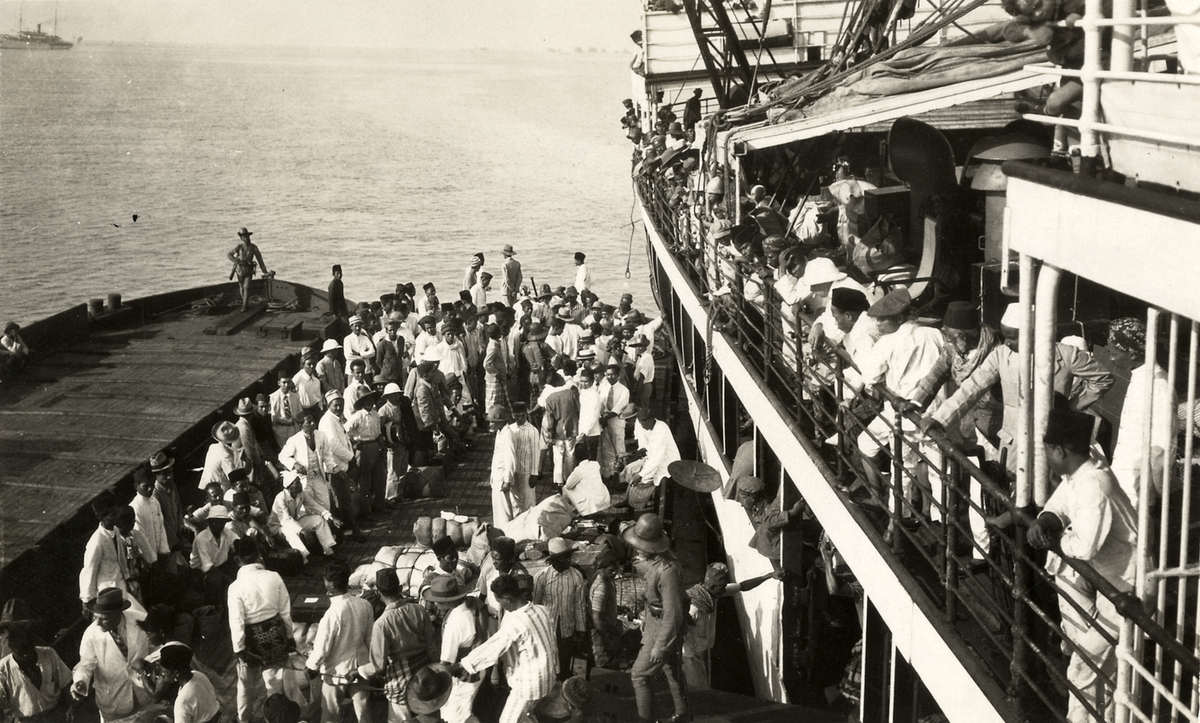
Indonesian communist prisoners being exiled to Boven-Digoel, 1927

In February 1927, at age 30, she was detained in the mass arrests of Communist Party activists and leaders which took place across Java. She was exiled to Boven-Digoel concentration camp along with roughly a thousand other PKI members who were detained there indefinitely without charge. Relatively few women activists were arrested and exiled there; among these were Sarekat Ra'jat activists and educators including not only Moenasiah and Soetitah in Semarang but also Soekaesih and Saama, two activists in the women's division of the organization in Batavia.

She was released from her internment in Boven-Digoel in December 1930 along with a large group of 144 detainees. After her release it is unclear where she went or whether she remained politically active.
