= Soekaesih =

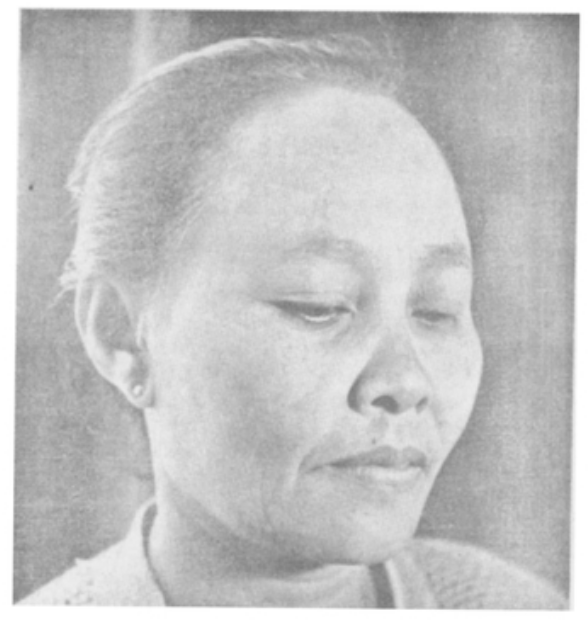
Soekaesih in the 1930s

Soekaesih (EYD: Sukaesih, born c. 1895) was a Communist Party of Indonesia activist known for being one of only a handful of female political prisoners exiled by the Netherlands government to Boven-Digoel concentration camp (from 1928 to 1931). After being released she traveled to the Netherlands in the late 1930s and campaigned for the camp to be shut down.

== Biography ==
Soekaesih was born in Garut, West Java, Dutch East Indies around 1895 to a noble Sundanese family. Her father was a subdistrict chief who died when she was six; she then lived with her grandfather, himself a retired official. She was forced to marry a man in his 40s at age 13 or 14; they were married for four years before she was able to divorce him.

Her political activity began when she was shocked by sugar strikes in her district and the Dutch massacres of peasants; she was influenced by the Sarekat Islam movement, a mass anti-colonial organization of the Indonesian National Awakening. At some point she remarried to a Sarekat Islam member named Soekarna; they relocated to Batavia in 1921. She was co-founder of the Communist Party's women's section in Batavia in around 1926 and was also active in its affiliate group the Sarekat Rakjat (Popular union) along with Moenasiah and other women communists. For a time in 1927, she was chair of the Weltevreden branch of the Sarekat Istri (Wife's Union), also known as the Perhimpunan Persatoean Isterie. During the mid-1920s she regularly attended Communist Party meetings in Batavia, Preanger, and Banten.

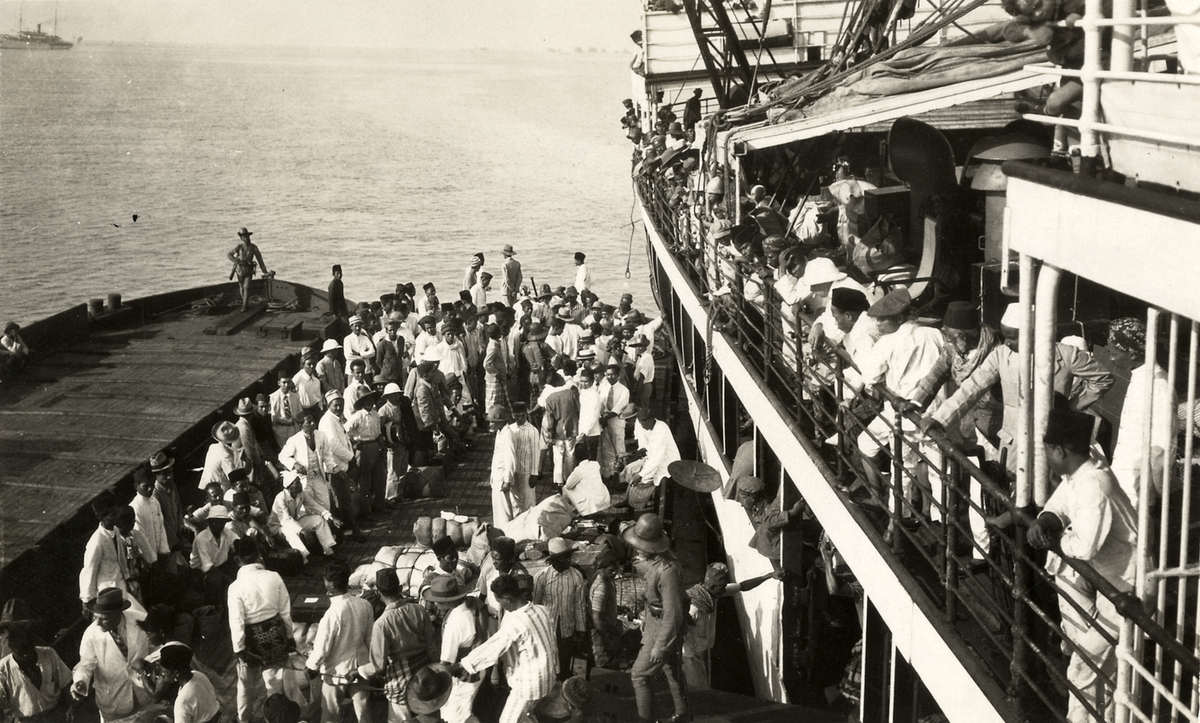
Indonesian communist prisoners being exiled to Boven-Digoel concentration camp, 1927

In February 1927 she and her husband were detained in the mass arrests of Communist Party activists and leaders which took place across Java; they were in Tasikmalaya at the time. She was nominated for exile to the Boven-Digoel concentration camp in early 1927; although she was not formally charged, the accusations against her were that she had acted as a courier for Communist Party cells during the 1926 uprisings and that her speeches against forced marriage and other topics contravened the colonial Penal code. She was held in pretrial detention for a year, until being exiled to Digoel in April 1928. Relatively few women activists were arrested and exiled there; among these were Sarekat Ra'jat activists and educators including not only Soetitah and Moenasiah in Semarang and Saama, a fellow activist in the women's division of the organization in Batavia. On the other hand, many women ended up travelling there and living with their interned husbands during the late 1920s and 1930s. One estimate from early 1928 stated that, out of 823 people interned at the Tanah-Merah camp in Digoel, only 15 were women, but another 231 women had traveled there to live with their interned husbands. Soekaesih's husband Sukarna died while they were imprisoned there. She was released from Digoel in 1931 as part of a mass release of political prisoners. She remarried once again to a Dutch man named J. H. Philippo in 1931; he was a Communist Party of the Netherlands member and dock worker at Tanjung Priok. During the mid-1930s the two of them acted as liaisons between the Indonesian Communist Party and their Dutch counterparts.

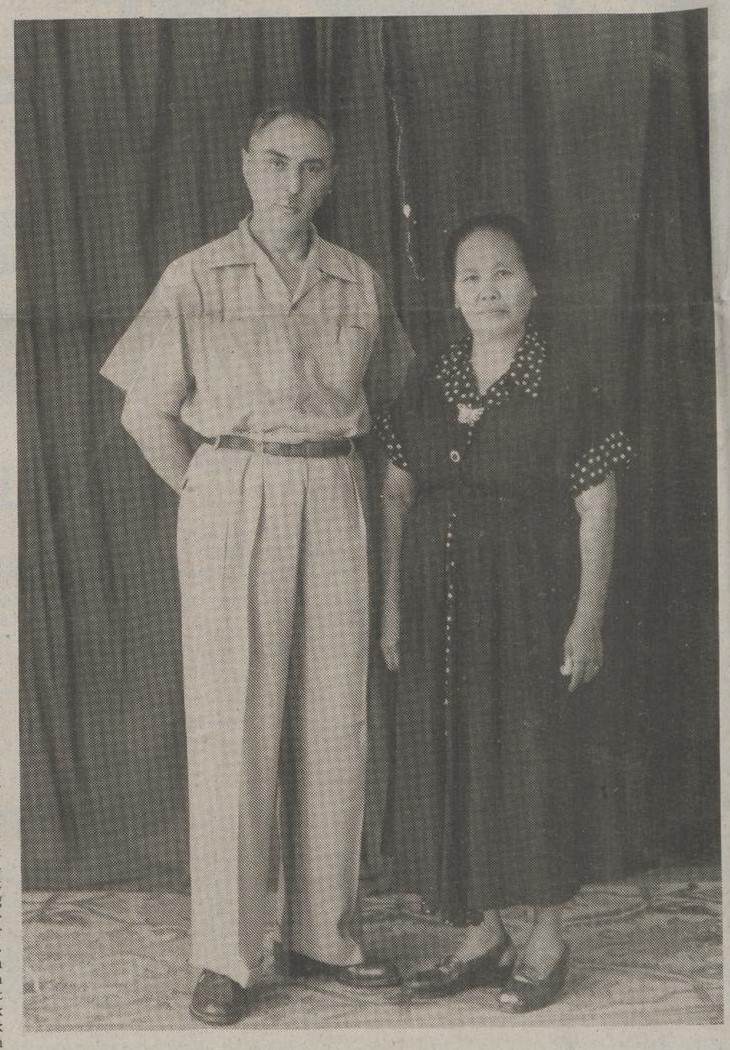
Soekaesih and J. H. Philippo, 1930s

She traveled to the Netherlands in October 1937 with Philippo and a retired schoolteacher named Van Munster. According to some accounts, they were deported there because Philippo was suspected of trying to revive the banned Communist Party of Indonesia. She stayed there for several years lecturing on Digoel, especially to local groups of the Communist Party of the Netherlands, and advocating for the camp to be shut down. Her lectures were generally given in Indonesian and were translated into Dutch by Rustam Effendi or others. During this period, the former camp doctor L. J. A. Schoonheyt, who had since become a member of the National Socialist Movement in the Netherlands, was also touring and giving lectures in favour of the camp. Soekaesih and van Munster wrote and published a pamphlet contradicting his claims about the positive nature of the camp, titled Indonesia, een politiestaat (met een antwoord aan dr. Schoonheyt) (Indonesia, a police state, with an answer to dr. Schoonheyt). The brochure quickly sold out of the first printing and was reprinted the following year.

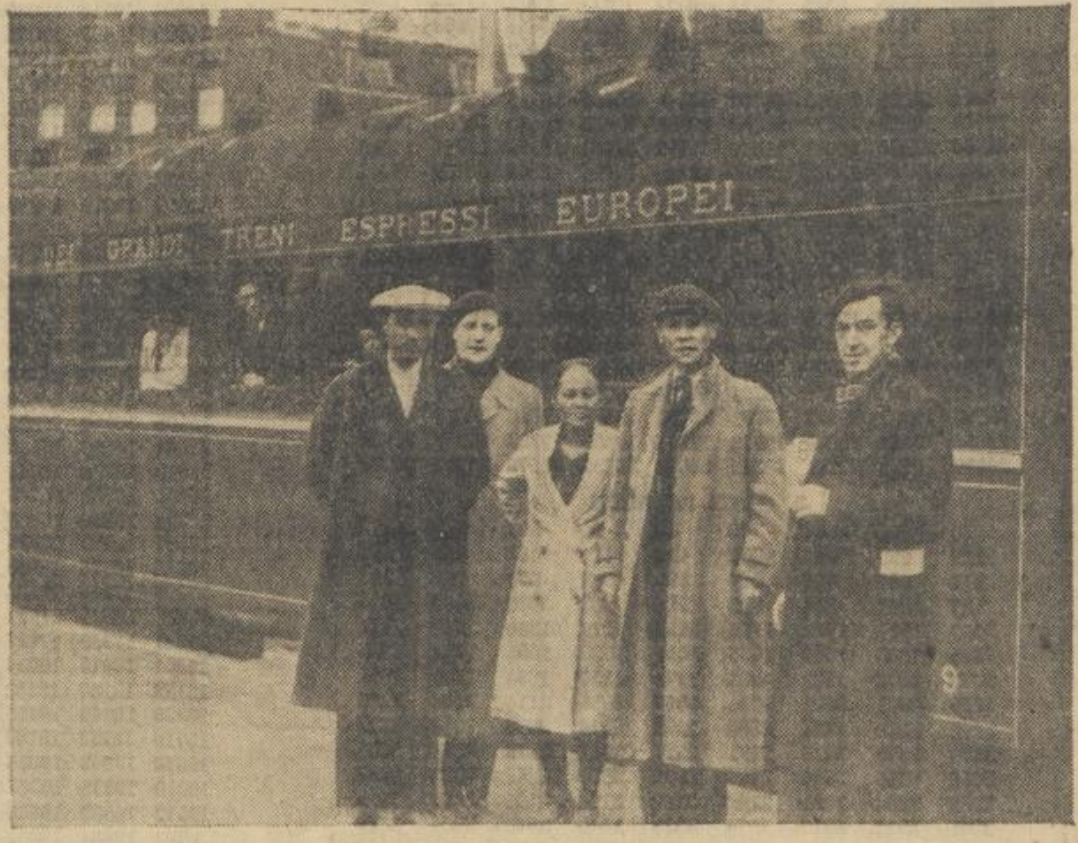
Soekasih arrived in the Netherlands with her husband J. H. Philippo, in 1937

During World War II Soekaesih and Philippo remained in the Netherlands working clandestinely for the Communist Party. They returned to Indonesia in 1946. She continued to be active in documenting the former camp at Digul (which was closed after World War II) and in 1955 joined a new organization that sought to promote research about it and to build connections between the families of former internees. Her adopted son Boejoeng Saleh Poeradisastra was also a Communist activist and became a political prisoner at Buru during the Transition to the New Order. Her place and time of death are not documented.

== Legacy ==
In 2019, as part of an effort to rename streets in a new district in Amsterdam after anti-colonial figures, her name was approved for a street name on the central island of IJburg, which is currently still under construction.
