= Soetitah =

Indonesian activist

Soetitah (born circa 1890, date of death unknown) was a Sarekat Islam and Communist Party of Indonesia (PKI) propagandist, activist, and schoolteacher in Semarang, Dutch East Indies in the 1910s and 1920s. She was a close ally of Semaun, Tan Malaka, and other Semarang communists of the time and was chair of the women's section of the party in the early 1920s. She was exiled by the Dutch to the Boven-Digoel concentration camp from 1927 to 1930.

== Biography ==
Soetitah was born in Semarang, Central Java, Dutch East Indies in around 1890. Little is known about her early life or family background.

She became involved in the Sarekat Islam and radical politics during World War I; she later described herself as having come from very poor and desperate circumstances and having been inspired by the left-wing Sarekat Islam leader Semaun. By 1919 she was leading mass gatherings of thousands of Semarang SI members and helping organize a new division of that organization specifically for women. The Semarang branch of the Sarekat Islam was far more leftist than most of that organization. She was president of the women's section of that branch by 1920, with one of her close allies Moenasiah, a Warung operator from Semarang, as vice-president.

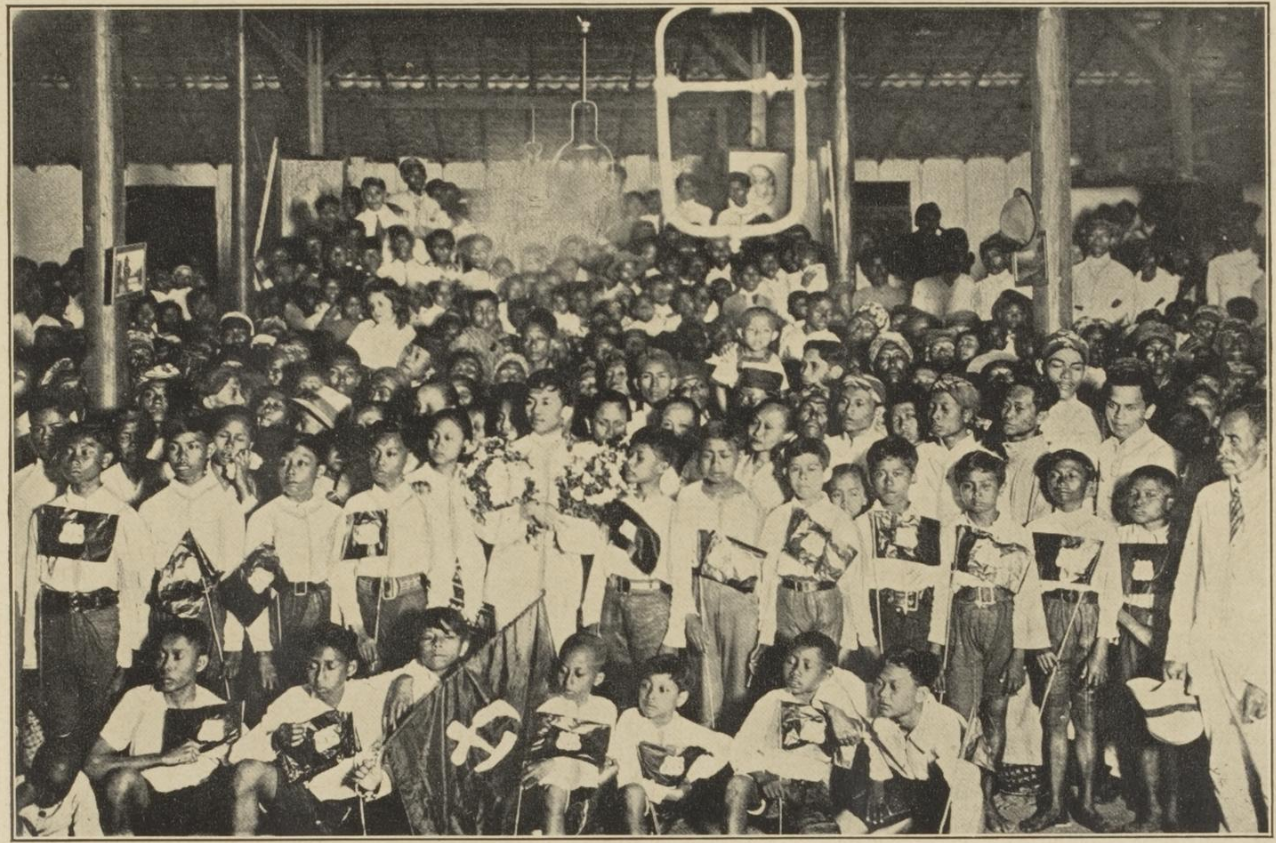
Sarekat Islam youth group in Semarang holding a hammer-and-sickle flag, 1922. Tan Malaka stands in the middle as a teacher.

Tan Malaka, a prominent Indonesian communist at the time, supported the expansion of independent leftist schools and for the creation of women's factions in the communist movement. After Tan Malaka was exiled from the Indies in the spring of 1922, she spoke up in his defense and stated that the Indies needed a mass organization for native women. In 1923 the Semarang branch of the Sarekat Islam distanced itself increasingly from the central body of the organization in Batavia (led by H. O. S. Tjokroaminoto and reorganized itself more explicitly as the Indonesian Communist Party; her ally Moenasiah became vice-chair of the women's section of the new party. And later in 1923 when there were mass arrests of Semarang SI/PKI leaders, including Semaun, she spoke out passionately and advocated for a strike of the communist-affiliated tramway personnel. Because of that speech, she and other members of the women's committee (Moenasiah and Napsiah) were also arrested, although they were released after a short time.

However, many members remained in the SI and the Semarang branch continued to exist until around 1924 or 1925, when it renamed itself Sarekat Ra'jat (people's union), this time with Moenasiah as chair and Soetitah as vice-chair of the women's section. They also held similar roles in the women's section of the Communist Party itself during this period where Aliarcham was the key party leader. The Sarekat Ra'jat, like the SI, had its own system of independent schools and Soetitah was involved in recruitment and teaching in them.

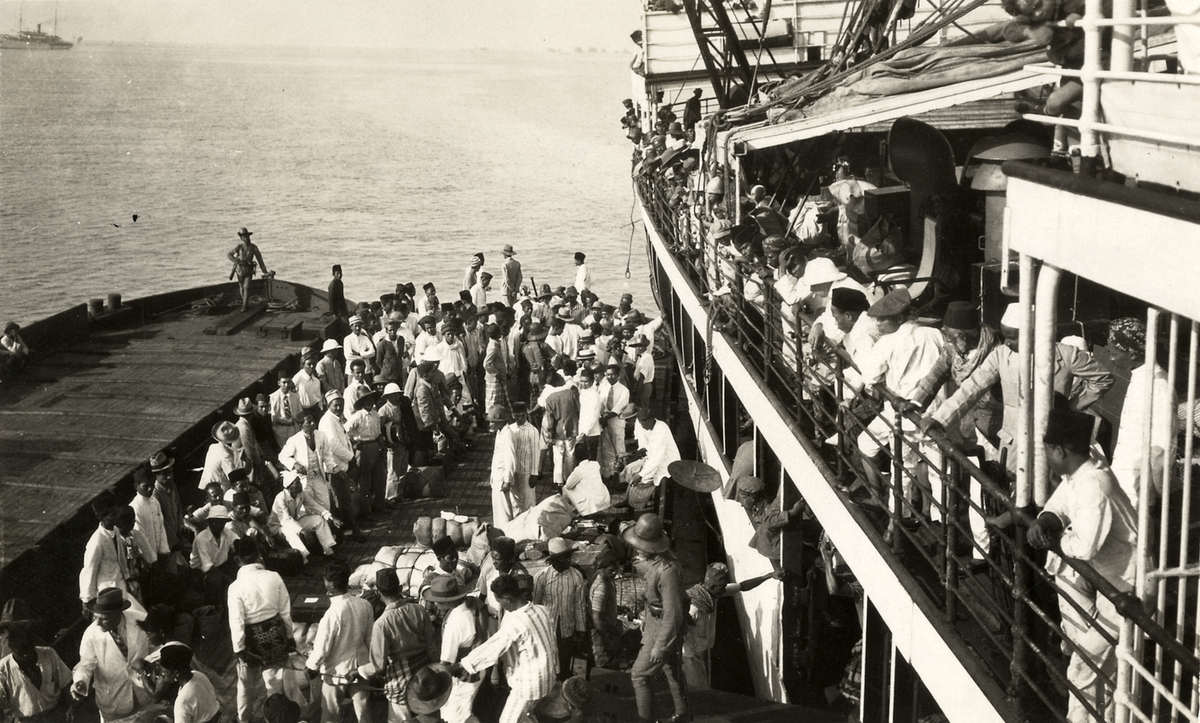
Indonesian communist prisoners being exiled to Boven-Digoel, 1927

In late 1926 she was detained in the mass arrests of Communist Party activists and leaders which took place across Java. In early 1927 she was ordered to be exiled to Boven-Digoel concentration camp along with roughly a thousand other PKI members who were detained there indefinitely without charge. Relatively few women activists were arrested and exiled there; among these were Sarekat Ra'jat activists and educators including not only Soetitah and Moenasiah in Semarang but also Soekaesih and Saama, two activists in the women's division of the organization in Batavia. On the other hand, many women ended up travelling their and living with their interned husbands during the late 1920s and 1930s. One estimate from early 1928 stated that, out of 823 people interned at the Tanah-Merah camp in Digoel, only 15 were women, but another 231 women had traveled there to live with their interned husbands.

She was released from her internment in Boven-Digoel in December 1930 along with a large group of 144 detainees. After her release it is unclear where she went or whether she remained politically active.
