= Indonesian Islamic Union Party =

Former Islamic political party in Indonesia

Indonesian Islamic Union Party Partai Syarikat Islam Indonesia
- Abbreviation: PSII
- Leader: Taufik Tjokroaminoto
- General Secretary: Amaruddin Djajasubita
- Founded: 1923 (original); 1947 (split from Masyumi); 1998 (revival)
- Dissolved: 5 January 1973 (original); After 2002 (revival)
- Split from: Masyumi
- Preceded by: Sarekat Islam
- Merged into: PPP
- Headquarters: Jakarta
- Membership (1934): 45,000
- Ideology: Islamic socialism
- Religion: Islam
- National affiliation: PPPKI (1927–29); League of Indonesian Muslimin

Indonesian Islamic Union Party (Indonesian: Partai Sarekat Islam Indonesia) was an Islamic political party in Indonesia before and after independence. In 1973 it was merged into the United Development Party.

== The pre-independence party ==
=== Establishment and aims ===
The Sarekat Islam (Islamic Association) was a pre-war political organization in the then-Dutch East Indies. Following a split brought about by the increasing influence of the Indonesian Communist Party (PKI), at the organization's 1923 conference, Oemar Said Tjokroaminoto and Agus Salim set up the Islamic Union Party (Indonesian: Partai Sarekat Islam - PSI) to rid the organization of the PKI. The PSII supported Sukarno's efforts to unite Indonesian political organizations following the establishment of the Indonesian National Party (PNI) in 1927. The PSI changed its name to the Indonesian Islamic Union Party (PSII) in 1929.

At the 1930 party congress held in Yogyakarta, the party outlined its six key principles, namely:

- Unity of the Islamic community (ummah) based on Al Imran verse 102 in the Quran
- Independence of the Ummah in their own country
- Democratic national governance in line with Ash-Shura verse 38 in the Quran
- Prosperity of the people brought about by state-owned companies overseen by the people in line with Islamic principles
- Equality in life and before the law in line with Al-Hujurat verse 13 in the Quran
- Real Islamic-based independence on the principles of equality and brotherhood

=== Splits in the party ===
Following allegations of misusing party funds, in 1933 Soekiman Wirjosandjojo and Soerjopranoto, both senior party figures, were expelled from the PSII. Along with other PSII dissidents, Soekiman formed the Indonesian Islamic Political Party (Parii), and in 1938, after a failed reconciliation with the PSII, the Indonesian Islamic Party. Meanwhile, the fortunes of the PSII waned in 1934 when the Dutch colonial authorities clamped down on nationalist activities and party leader Tjokroaminoto died. Following this, Abikusno Tjokrosujoso (Tjokroaminoto's younger brother) and S. M. Kartosuwiryo took control of the party. Agus Salim was expelled, and the party began to take a much tougher anti-colonial stance.

=== The PSII in alliances ===
In September 1937, the Supreme Islamic Council of Indonesia (Indonesian: Majlis Islam A'laa Indonesia, MIAI), a grouping of Muslim organisations including the PSII, was formed by Mas Mansoer, Ahmad Dahlan and Abdul Wahab Hasbullah. Established to discuss religious matters, pressure from the PSII and the Indonesian Islamic Party at the 1938 conference resulted in it becoming more political in nature. Also in 1938, following discussions between PSII chairman Abikusno Tjokrosujoso and Soetomo, the leader of the nationalist party Parindra, the PSII tried to establish an organisation to unite the nationalist movement by inviting delegates from Parindra and two other organisations, Gerindo and Paguyuban Pasundan to a meeting in March. This resulted in the establishment of the Mediating Body for Indonesian Political Parties (Bapeppi), but as neither Gerindo nor Paguyuban Pasundan were prepared to join it, it achieved nothing. Later that same year, Mohammad Husni Thamrin from Parindra took the initiative, and was largely responsible for the formation of the Indonesian Political Federation (GAPI), which brought together all the nationalist inorganizations except the PNI. It included organisations that had taken a more cooperative stance with the colonial government by agreeing to take seats in the Volksraad quasi-legislature, as well as those that were non-cooperative, such as the PSII.

Within GAPI, the PSII was uninterested in international affairs, unlike some other members of the organisation. Within GAPI, it was the foremost campaigner for GAPI's 1939 call for an Indonesian parliament, which Abikusno Tjokrosujoso said had first been demanded by the Sarekat Islam under Tjokroaminoto. Despite the PSII's dislike of working with the "cooperating" parties within GAPI, the party explained that support for a parliament was not a softening of its non-cooperative stance: the party would cooperate with the Dutch only after a parliament had been established. On 12 December 1942, after the outbreak of War with Japan, GAPI and the executive of the Indonesian People's Council (MRI), an organisation comprising GAPI, the MIAI and the PVPN civil service union released a statement calling for the Indonesian population to cooperate with and obey the Dutch colonial to defend peace and maintain order. Although this led to government finally agreeing to hold talks because Abikusno Tjokrosujoso, a member of the MRI executive, had not been consulted in advance, the PSII withdrew from GAPI and along with the MIAI also left the MRI. In 1942 the occupying Japanese banned all political activity, and the party announced the closure of its head office on 9 May. Rather than working with the MIAI, in 1943 the Japanese established an organization called Masyumi in an attempt to control Islam in Indonesia.

== Post-independence ==
=== Revival of the party ===
After the 17 August 1945 Indonesian Declaration of Independence, at the end of October, the Working Committee of the Central Indonesian National Committee, the acting legislature, called for political parties to be formed. A new organization, also called Masyumi, was formed on 7 November. It comprised all the members of the wartime Masyumi, including the PSII.

In July 1947, the PSII, which had never ceased to be a distinct organization, split from Masyumi, ostensibly because of disagreements with the leadership, especially with Natsir. However, Masyumi and other politicians of the time took the view that the main reason for reestablishing the party was to obtain seats in the new cabinet as other main parties had rejected Masyumi's demands to be given a dominant role in it - including the position of prime minister. In return for support for the cabinet from an Islamic party, the PSII was given fiveseats in the new cabinet formed by Amir Sjarifuddin which took office on 3 July. The new PSII, led by Wondoamiseno and Arudji Kartawinata claimed to be same organization as the pre-war party. It did not cooperate with Masyumi after the split although leaders of both parties claimed their differences were minor, and was not as strong as Masyumi nationally.

=== The PSII in cabinet and parliament ===
After Amir Sjarifuddin reshuffled the cabinet in November 1947, in the new lineup, the PSII was given five seats, including deputy prime minister. When this cabinet collapsed on 23 January 1948, the PSSI did not sit in any cabinets for more than two years. Following the reestablishment of the Indonesian unitary state after the dissolution of the United States of Indonesia in 1950, the PSII was given four seats in the Provisional People's Representative Council and chairman of the Masyumi executive council Mohammad Natsir appointed one PSSI member, Harsono Tjokroaminoto to his cabinet, which took office on 6 September. However, Harsono resigned on 31 December shortly after the PSII had voted against a parliamentary motion of confidence in the cabinet. Haroso's brother, Anwar Tjokroaminoto was the only PSSI member in the Wilopo Cabinet, serving as social affairs minister from April 1952 until he resigned in May 1953.

The party came fifth in the 1955 legislative election with 2.9 percent of the vote, winning eight seats in the People's Representative Council. In the 1971 election it won 2.4 percent of the vote and ten seats, but shortly after was forced to fuse into the United Development Party, ending its existence as a separate political entity.

=== Post-Suharto revival ===
After the forced merger of the parties, the PSII became a mass nonpolitical organization called Syarekat Islam. Following the fall of Suharto, on 29 May 1998 the PSII was revived with Taufiq Rusjdi Tjokroaminoto, grandson of Oemar Said Tjokroaminoto, as chairman. In the 1999 election it received less than 0.5% of the vote, winning one seat in the legislature, held by Amaruddin Djajasubita, representing Tasikmalaya. Party chair Taufiq Rusjdi Tjokroaminoto died in February 2001 and the party was subsequently dissolved according to the 2002 Political Parties Law.

== Election results ==
=== House of Representatives ===
| Election | Leader | Seats | | Total votes | Share of votes | Outcome of election |
| Election | Leader | No. | ± | Total votes | Share of votes | Outcome of election |
|---|---|---|---|---|---|---|
| 1955 | Anwar Tjokroaminoto | 8 / 257 | | 1,091,106 | 2.89% | Governing coalition |
| 1971 | Anwar Tjokroaminoto | 10 / 360 | ▲2 | 1,308,237 | 2.39 | Governing coalition |
| 1999 | Taufik Rusjdi Tjokroaminoto | 1 / 462 | ▼9 | 375,920 | 0.36% | Opposition |

=== Constitutional Assembly ===
| Election | Leader | Seats | Votes | % of votes | Bloc |
|---|---|---|---|---|---|
| 1955 | Anwar Tjokroaminoto | 16 / 514 | 1,059,922 | 2.80% | Islamic Bloc |

== See also ==
- Politics of Indonesia
- List of political parties in Indonesia
