= Z. A. Ahmad =

Indonesian politician

Z. A. Ahmad was an Islamic scholar and politician in Indonesia. He was a member of Permi, and joined PII (Indonesian Islamic Party) after the banning of Permi in 1933. He became the leader of PII in Sumatra. In the 1950s he became a member of the Masyumi Leadership Council.
