= Indonesian Political Federation =

Indonesian political organization (1939–1942)

The Indonesian Political Federation (Indonesian: Gabungan Politik Indonesia, GAPI) was an umbrella organization of various nationalist organizations in the Dutch East Indies which existed from 1939 to 1942. Founded to unite the nationalist movement, GAPI championed the creation of an Indonesian parliament in exchange for cooperation with the Dutch colonial government. The federation consisted of eight political parties. GAPI was dissolved shortly after the invasion of the colony by the Empire of Japan in 1942.

== Background ==
In 1927, the Association of Political Organisations of the Indonesian People (PPPKI) was formed to unite nationalist Indonesian organisations, but it faced oppression from the colonial authorities, and disbanded in 1934. As a result of Dutch actions against non-cooperative nationalist organisations such as the Indonesian National Party (PNI), from 1935 cooperating parties that were prepared to work with the colonial authorities by participating in the Volksraad semi-legislative body assumed a dominant role in the nationalist movement. However, these cooperating nationalists still gave very little support when the Soetardjo Petition asking for a conference to discuss Indonesian autonomy was introduced in the Volksraad in 1936, viewing it as pointless or disloyal to the demands for independence.

However, as the Second World War loomed, more Indonesian nationalists took the view that if they were to adopt a cooperative stance with the colonial administration against fascism, this might cause the Dutch to agree to a degree of autonomy for the East Indies, despite the fact that at the same time, the Dutch were placing more and more restrictions on Indonesian political activity, particularly towards the apparently pro-Japan Great Indonesia Party (Parindra). In 1938, a conference organised by the Indonesian Islamic Union Party (PSII), Parindra, the Indonesian People's Movement (Gerindo) and Paguyuban Pasundan resulted in the establishment of a body called the Mediating Body for Indonesian Political Parties (Bapeppi), but as only two of the parties were prepared to join it, it achieved nothing. Prominent nationalist Mohammad Husni Thamrin then instigated talks to set up a new umbrella organisation.

== Establishment ==
On 21 May 1939, at a meeting chaired by Thamrin, eight major nationalist organizations joined together to form Indonesian Political Federation (GAPI). The Indonesian National Party (PNI) did not join as it was serving a ban on meetings. The members were:

- Great Indonesia Party (Parindra)
- Indonesian People's Movement (Gerindo)
- Paguyuban Pasundan
- Indonesian Islamic Union Party (PSII)
- Indonesian Islamic Party
- Minahasa Union
- Catholic Party
- Indonesia Arab Association

The joint chairmen were Amir Sjarifuddin (Gerindo), Abikusno Tjokrosujoso (Islamic Union Party) and Thamrin (Parndra).

== Program ==
The federation used the slogan Indonesia berparlemen - a parliament for Indonesia". The members agreed to refrain from individual actions, and to only work as a collective whole. The political program of the federation was to strive for:

- a popularly elected parliament
- Indonesian self-determination
- national unity
- anti-fascism through solidarity with the Netherlands

Unlike the PPPKI, decisions were taken on the basis of one vote for each member party, which gave GAPI more freedom of action.

== Activities ==
GAPI held a meeting on 4 July 1939 to discuss policy and to plan for an Indonesian People's Congress in December 1939. Over the next few months it worked out a policy platform, including support for workers' rights and cooperation with the Dutch colonial government. It also decided that if Indonesia was given a popularly-elected parliament, GAPI would urge the people to fully support the government.

On 1 October 1939, 3,000 people attended a public meeting in Batavia that GAPI had organised to launch its Indonesia berparlemen campaign. On 17 December, around 90,000 people attended public meetings organised by local GAPI committees across the East Indies.

The Indonesian People's Congress (Kongres Rakyat Indonesia, KRI) was held from 25-26 December 1939. A total of 90 groups were represented, including religious, economic and social organisations as well as political parties. Echoing the Youth Pledge eleven years beforehand, and as part of the effort to stress the need for unity, the conference adopted the Indonesian language, the red and white Indonesian flag and the song Indonesia Raya as the national anthem. It also called for the Indonesia berparlemen slogan to be realized through the semi-legislative Volksraad body becoming democratic and truly representative of the Indonesian people. This would form the basis of cooperation with the Dutch in the face of the threat from global fascism. There was no response from the Dutch to this call for greater autonomy. On the second day, it was decided that the KRI would be a permanent organization, with GAPI as its executive. It would work to improve the welfare of Indonesians, with the establishment of a parliament as the first step.

In May 1940, the Germans invaded the Netherlands. In August, GAPI pointed out that as the East Indies was fighting the war allied with democratic nations, it should be run as a democracy itself as this would encourage the population to defend the colony. In September, GAPI asked the Dutch government, then in exile in London, for a Dutch-Indonesian union and a fully-elected Volksraad. As a result of demands both from within and outside the Volksraad, on 14 September 1940, the Dutch established the Visman Commission headed by Council of the Indies member F.H. Visman to hear the views of Indonesian nationalists. In February 1941, GAPI presented its detailed proposals to the Commission, as follows:

- a directly-elected bicameral parliament within five years
- a unitary state of Indonesia
- ministers appointed by the head of state and responsible to parliament
- a Dutch-Indonesian federation

Following a visit by the Dutch foreign and colonial affairs ministers from March to June 1941, East Indies Governor-General van Starkenborgh announced that a conference would be held after the war to discuss the political future of the colony. In response, Gapi expressed disappointment over this promise.

At a second congress, from 13-14 September 1941 in Yogyakarta, a motion was passed renaming the Indonesian People's Congress to the Indonesian People's Council (Madjelis Rakyat Indonesia, MRI), headed by a 15-member leadership board with equal representation from GAPI, the MIAI Islamic federation and the PVPN civil service union. As a representative body for Indonesian nationalists, it aimed to establish a fully representative parliament. On 12 December, after the outbreak of War with Japan, GAPI and the MRI executive released a statement calling for the Indonesian population to cooperate with and obey the government to defend peace and maintain order. The government responded to the GAP and MRI for the first time, and finally agreed to hold discussions. However, in protest at not being consulted in advance about the GAPI/MRI statement, the PSII withdrew from both GAPI and the MRI. On 15 January 1942, the government and MRI held a historic meeting, but by then, the Japanese invasion of the Dutch East Indies had begun. Following the surrender of the Dutch, on 20 March the Japanese occupation authorities banned all political activity.

== Works cited ==
- Abeyasekere, Susan (1976). One Hand Clapping : Indonesian Nationalists and the Dutch 1939-1942. Centre of Southeast Asian Studies, Monash University. ISBN 0909835381.
- Arniati Prasedyawati Herkusumo (1982). Chuo Sangi-in: Dewan Pertimbang Pusat Pada Masa Pendudukan Jepang [Chuo Sangi-in: The Central Advisory Council during the Japanese Occupation] (in Indonesian). Jakarta, Indonesia: PT. Rosda Jayaputra.
- Cribb, R.B; Kahin, Audrey (2004). Historical Dictionary of Indonesia. Scarecrow Press. ISBN 9780810849358.
- Kahin, George McTurnan (1952). Nationalism and Revolution in Indonesia. Ithaca, NY: Cornell University Press. ISBN 0-8014-9108-8.
- Kusuma, A.B (2004). Lahirnya Undang-Undang Dasar 1945 : memuat salinan dokumen otentik badan oentoek menyelidiki oesaha2 persiapan kemerdekaan [The Birth of the 1945 Constitution: including copies of the authentic documents of the Investigating Committee for Preparatory Work for Independence] (in Indonesian). Depok, Indonesia: Badan Penerbit Fakultas Hukum Universitas Indonesia. ISBN 979-8972-28-7.
- Ricklefs, M.C. (2008) [1981]. A History of Modern Indonesia Since c.1300 (4th ed.). London: MacMillan. ISBN 978-0-230-54685-1.
- Soerjono (April 1980). "On Musso's Return" (PDF). Indonesia. 29 (29): 59–90. doi:10.2307/3351005. JSTOR 3351005.
