= Indonesian Islamic Party =

Former political party in the Dutch East Indies

Indonesian Islamic Party Partai Islam Indonesia
- Abbreviation: PII
- Leader: Soekiman Wirjosandjojo
- Founded: 4 December 1938
- Dissolved: c. March 1942
- Split from: Indonesian Islamic Union Party (PSII)
- Ideology: Islamic socialism
- National affiliation: Indonesian Political Federation (GAPI)

The Indonesian Islamic Party (Indonesian: Partai Islam Indonesia, PII) was an Islamic political party in the Dutch East Indies (now Indonesia). Formed by dissenting members of the Indonesian Islamic Union Party (PSII) in 1938, the party was dissolved by the occupying Japanese in May 1942.

== History ==
=== Background and establishment ===
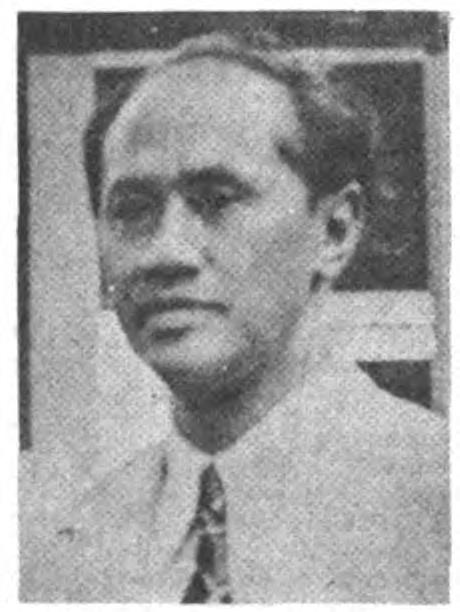
Soekiman Wirjosandjojo (pictured), was the founder and leader of the party

In 1933, Soekiman Wirjosandjojo and Soerjopranoto, two senior members of the Indonesian Islamic Union Party (PSII), were expelled from the party, ostensibly for misusing party funds, but possibly because of their opposition to the rise of a faction within the PSSI that opposed any cooperation with the Dutch colonial administration. Together with other disaffected PSSI members, Soekiman formed the Indonesian Islamic Political Party (Partij Politiek Islam Indonesia, Parii). In 1935, Parii held a conference in Yogyakarta, at which it was apparent that the party did not yet have enough branches. Two years later, at its congress in Bandung, the PSII passed a motion revoking the 1933 expulsions as both men responsible for the decision, Oemar Said Tjokroaminoto and Agus Salim, had since died. Soekiman and his associates rejoined the PSII, and Parii was officially merged into it.

However, at the next PSII congress in December 1938, Soekiman, dissatisfied at his faction not being given leadership positions, and a number of members of the Muhammadiyah and Jong Islamieten Bond organizations, established the Indonesian Islamic Party (PII). Still led by Soekiman, they founded the party as a "cooperating" organisation, much like the Parindra and Gerindo political parties, meaning that it was willing to participate in representative councils established by the Dutch, principally the quasi-legislative Volksraad.

=== Party Activities and dissolution ===
In May 1939, the PII joined other nationalist organizations in the Indonesian Political Federation (GAPI), which was established most on the initiative of Mohammad Husni Thamrin as an umbrella organization to unite the various nationalist organizations. That same year, Wiwoho Poerbohadidjojo of the PII was appointed to the Volksraad, in which the party had only one seat. On 11 April 1940 the PII, which by then had 115 branches, held its first congress in Yogyakarta. It officially adopted the articles of foundation, confirmed Soekiman as party chairman and appointed Mas Mansoer as party adviser. However, the following month, the Germans invaded the Netherlands, and under the state of emergency that was declared, the PII was not allowed to hold public meetings, and its activities came to a halt. In 1942, the Japanese occupied the Dutch East Indies, and political organisations were banned. The PII announced the closure of its head office on 20 May.

== Ideology ==
The party's founding articles were announced when the PII was founded on 4 December 1938. The main aim of the party was to prepare the Indonesian people to accept the rightful place for Islam and its followers by strengthening bonds between Muslims and between Islamic organizations. The party program included the formation of a unitary state with a democratic government, free and direct elections, expanding the right of assembly and right of expression, revocation of regulations regarding Islamic teachers, an end to immigration, nationalization of monopolies, legal protection for workers, and an end to the two-tier judicial system.
