= Neratja (newspaper) =

Former newspaper in Dutch East Indies

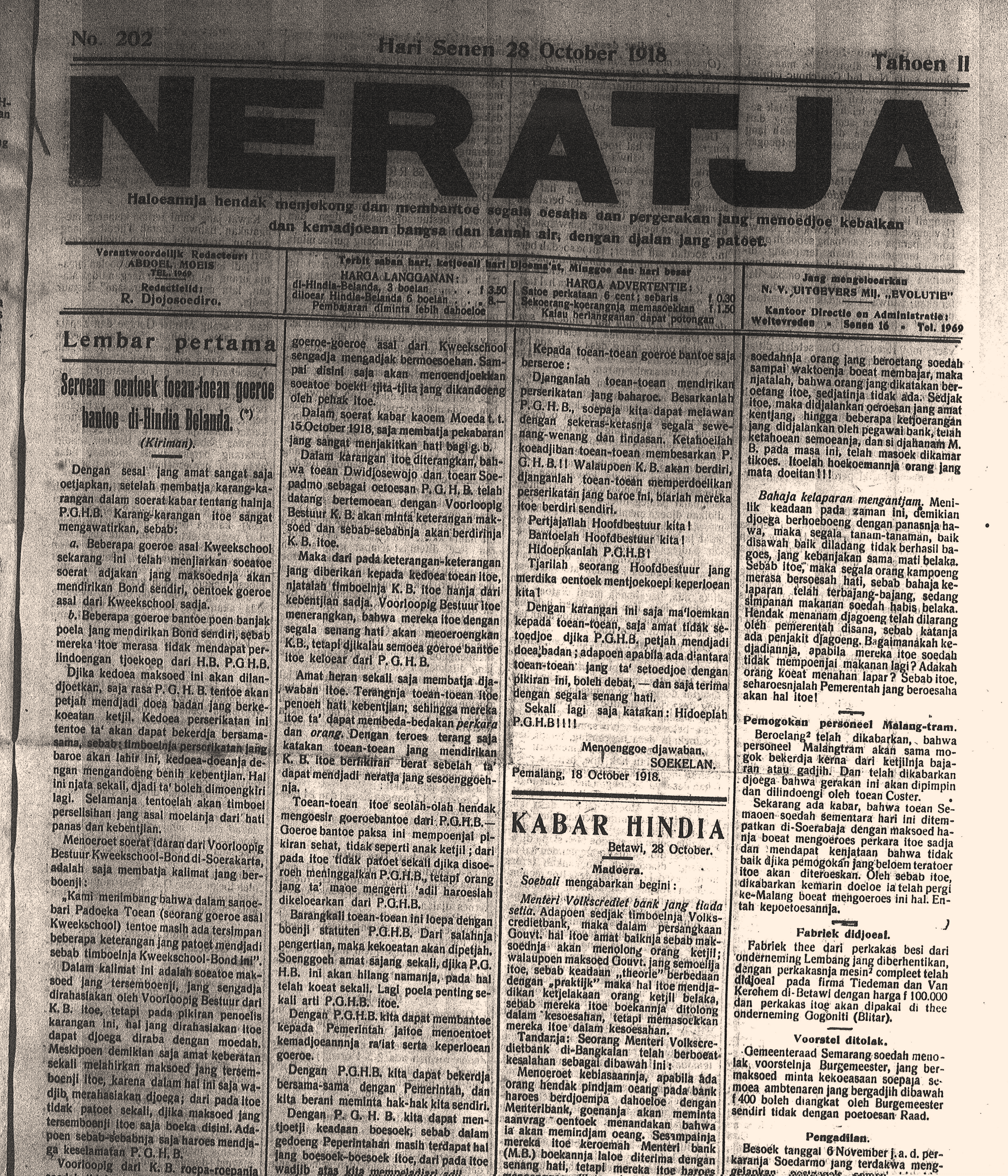
The front page of Neratja, October 26, 1918

Neratja (Malay: balance, scales EYD: Neraca), later Hindia Baroe (Malay: new Indies, EYD: Hindia Baru), was a Malay language newspaper printed from 1917 to 1926 in Weltevreden, Dutch East Indies. Although originally founded with government support to be a Malay voice for the Dutch Ethical Policy, before long it became associated with the Sarekat Islam and the Indonesian National Awakening. Among its editors were important figures of the Indonesian national movement such as Abdul Muis and Agus Salim.

== History ==
There were other newspapers with the name Neratja, such as one supported by the Dutch side in Medan during the Indonesian Revolution, a communist magazine from the 1930s called Neratja Masjarakat, and a Neratja printed in Jawi script Malay in Singapore in 1913.

=== Founding of Neratja and ties to colonial government ===
This Neratja was founded in 1917 in Weltevreden (now part of Jakarta), the location of the colonial government in the Dutch East Indies. It was owned by the company N.V. Uitgevers Maatschappij "Evolutie". Its original founders were Agus Salim and Raden Djojosoediro, who were both members of the Sarekat Islam and the Theosophical Society. A.M. Soetan Djenawi was hired as editor upon the launch as well. Abdul Muis soon joined as an editor as well.

It was originally funded partly by the Dutch colonial government (under the direction of Governor General Johan Paul van Limburg Stirum) which hoped to support a Malay-language forum for perspectives sympathetic to the Dutch Ethical Policy, a paternalistic policy aimed at selectively improving the lives of some elite Indonesians through education and government posts.

The first issue of Neratja was put out with this statement:

...as a newspaper, [...] everything that can benefit the progress of the Indies and its people will be supported, but this evolution is not imagined hastily, but along lines of gradualism, whereby many can benefit from it, while all actions, both of it government as the population itself, will be discussed without prejudice and in a proper manner.

People in the leftist faction of the Sarekat Islam, such as Darsono and Semaoen, believed Neratja to be in the pocket of the colonial government for years after the original funding had disappeared. Their ally, the Dutch communist Henk Sneevliet accused Neratja editor Abdul Muis of having advocated for his expulsion from the Indies in 1917. When Neratja was the only Malay language newspaper to applaud his expulsion in 1918, its editors were condemned by other newspapers and forced to apologize.

It would continue to be a problem for Agus Salim, as in 1927 the accusations were still surfacing. At that time he said that in 1917 he had needed money to continue his activities, and that everyone profited from the government in some way or other. But later in 1927 Bintang Timoer published allegations that Agus Salim had joined Sarekat Islam and other meetings in the 1910s and delivered reports to government officials, used government money to criticize communists in Neratja, and when those communists had been sent to internment camps, released a Social Democratic political platform of his own.

=== Political evolution ===
Despite his early collaboration, Agus Salim did turn against the Dutch and against the Ethical Policy Neratja had been founded to promote. He noticed that even the token gestures aimed at raising up elite Indonesians were being done less and less by the Dutch, and that Indonesians were once against being excluded from elite social spaces. Therefore, by 1918 Neratja became a harsh critic of the colonial government, regularly printing reports of mistreatment of Muslims in remote regions of the Indies. Therefore, the paper became increasingly persecuted by the Dutch under the strict press censorship laws (Persdelict) which did not tolerate printed descriptions of events that might embarrass the Dutch. In 1919 Abdul Muis was charged multiple times, in 1921 editor Moehamad Said, and again in 1923 charges were brought against the unnamed head editor.

Some other editors joined the paper during this phase. Rustam Sutan Palindih was one such, although the exact year is not clear. Another editor during the early 1920s was Soetadi, who stepped down when he was elected to the Volksraad, the colonial consultative parliament.

=== Hindia Baroe ===
In 1924 there were a number of announcements in the Indies newspapers that Neratja had been relaunched as new paper called Hindia Baroe (Malay: New Indies). One such notice in June 1924 noted that Agus Salim had been made head editor. Some editors from Neratja were apparently carried over to Hindia Baroe as well, such as Rustam Sutan Palindih.

=== Bankruptcy and subsequent legal troubles with Neratja ===
Hindia Baroe/Neratja, still under the editorship of Agus Salim, went bankrupt in late 1925 or early 1926. Yet even with the closure of the paper there continued to be legal problems and allegations in the press.

First, as mentioned above, the allegations about Agus Salim being a paid informant for the government in the early years of Neratja were made once again in 1927, and with more documentation.

Also in 1927, a problem arose with the printing press that had printed Neratja some years earlier. That Batavia printing house owned by the Indonesian Communist Party was called Drukkerij Jacatra. However, this printing house soon collapsed as it was persecuted by the Dutch authorities and many members of the communist movement were deported to concentration camps in Boven Digoel. This left some ambiguity about who owned it and who was responsible for it. Therefore, some commentators in the press at the time declared that Neratja and Hindia Baroe were "dead" due to mismanagement.

An even more serious case opened in 1928 against former editor Soetadi, then a sitting member of the Indies Volksraad (parliament). He was accused of having pocketed 15 thousand Dutch guilder from an investment in Neratja from the organization Perkoempoelan Guru Bantu in 1923.

By 1929, early Neratja editor Abdul Muis, who had worked for Kaoem Moeda in the years in between, became head of the Bintang Timoer, the paper which had leveled the most serious accusations of espionage against Agus Salim.
