= Abdoel Kahar Moezakir =

Indonesian academic

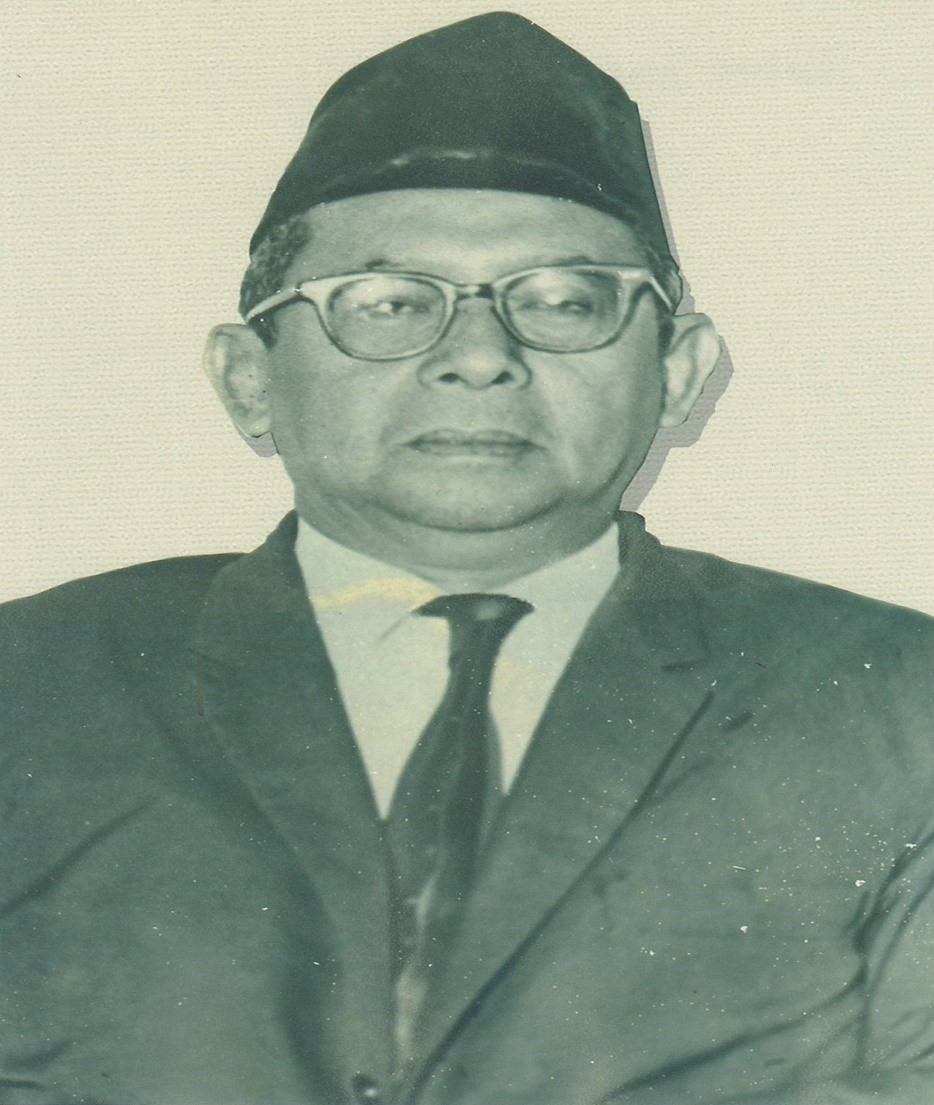

1st Rector of the Islamic University of Indonesia
- In office 8 July 1945 – 1960
- Succeeded by: Prof. Mr. RHA. Kasmat Bahuwinangun

Personal details
- Born: 16 April 1907 Gunung Kidul, Yogyakarta Sultanate, Dutch East Indies
- Died: 2 December 1973 (aged 66) Yogyakarta, Indonesia

Prof. K.H. Abdel Kahar Moezakir or new spelling Abdul Kahar Muzakir (16 April 1907 – 2 December 1973), was chosen Rector Magnificus Islamic University of Indonesia for the first time with the name of STI during two periods – 1945–48 and 1948–60 – he was a member of the Investigating Committee for Preparatory Work for Independence (BPUPK).

== Early life and education ==
Abdul Kahar Muzakkir was either born on 16 September 1907 or in 1908 in Kotagede. His father, Kyai Haji Muzakkir, was an ulama at the Masjid Gedhe Kauman in the Yogyakarta Palace. His mother, Khotijah, was the daughter of H. Mukmin, a merchant specializing in women’s clothing from Kotagede. His paternal uncle, Kyai Haji Muhammad Munawwir, the younger brother of his father, founded the Al-Munawwir Krapyak Islamic Boarding School (Pesantren Al-Munawwir Krapyak). His paternal ancestor was Kyai Hasan Besari, one of Pangeran Diponegoro's vassals. His childhood name was Dalhar.

He attended a Muhammadiyah elementary school in Selokramana until second grade. He then pursued Islamic studies at several institutions, including Madrasah Mamba’ul Ulum and Pondok Jamsaren in Surakarta, Pondok Krapyak in Yogyakarta, and Pondok Termas in Pacitan.

In 1924, Muzakkir performed the hajj to Mecca with his older brother. He had planned to continue his religious education there, but due to armed conflict in the region, he was compelled to move to Egypt, even though he already had the opportunity to study under Muhammady Al Baqir. In 1925, he enrolled at Al-Azhar University only for half a year because he felt the curriculum unsuitable for him. He then enrolled at Al-Mu'alimin in 1926 until 1930. Later he continued the postgraduate level at Darul Ulum majoring in pedagogy, Arabic, and Hebrew.

By 1928, he was an active member of the Indonesian student association in Cairo. In 1933, he, along with his friends, founded Perhimpoenan Indonesia Raja (PIR) in Cairo, becoming its first chairman. The organization cooperated with Perhimpunan Indonesia in the Netherlands. He was also a member of Jamiyah Chairiyah Jawiyah, an Indonesian and Malay youth association. Another organization he was in was Jamiyatul Syubban Muslimin, and he contributed in the publication called Seruan Azhar.

While in Egypt, Muzakkir contributed articles to Al-Ahram, Al-Balagh, Al-Fatayat, and Al-Hayat, aiming to inform Middle Eastern readers about the Indonesian independence movement. Mohamed Ali Eltaher saw his contributions in journalism and in 1936 he asked Muzakkir to be a writer for his newspaper Atsturah (Rebellion).

Muzakkir and his friend founded Indonesia Raya, a correspondence agency to supply materials to newspapers in Middle East and his homeland.

He was appointed as representative of the Dutch East Indies in World Islamic Congress in Palestine in 1931.

== Back to Indonesia ==
After finishing his studies in 1936, Muzakkir returned to his hometown of Yogyakarta in 1937. His arrival was reported by a Dutch colonial state newspaper on 21 June 1937. It was an unusual occurrence that, according to historian Amini, only happened because Muzakkir was already regarded as an important figure at the time.

=== Islamic organization and education ===
He was appointed director of Madrasah Muallimin in Yogyakarta, with the aim of applying his knowledge and experience to train future cadres. At the 26th Muhammadiyah congress held in Yogyakarta in 1937, he was invited to deliver a speech on youth and Islam before members of Nasyiatul Aisyiyah, a women’s youth organization affiliated with Muhammadiyah. He was a member of Pemuda Muhammadiyah (Youth of Muhammadiyah).

He was also a member of Majelis Islam A’la Indonesia (MIAI) a federation of several Islamic organizations. He represented MIAI at Islamic fair in Tokyo and Osaka on 5–29 November 1939.

In 1943, he was appointed a member of founding committee to found Sekolah Tinggi Islam (STI; Islamic College) in Jakarta initiated by Masyumi. On 8 July 1945, the college was officially established with Muzakkir as the president. He was still the president of the college when it needed to relocate to Yogyakarta on 4 April 1946 because of Dutch military aggression. He was still the president when the college was promoted to university to become Universiteit Islam Indonesia (UII) on 10 March 1948. He was then succeeded by Mr. Kasmat Bahoewinangoen, a colleague of PII and MIAI.

He became religious advisor of Askar Perang Sabil, militia of Muhammadiyah, during Dutch military aggression.

While holding position of UII president, Muzakkir also founded another Islamic university in Yogyakarta (now UIN Kalijaga).

=== Political career ===
Muzakkir was a member of the Indonesian Islamic Union Party (PSII). In 1938, because of ideological differences, the party split into several organizations, and Muzakkir became a member of the Indonesian Islamic Party. His political career in the PII ended in 1940 (or 1941 or 1942) because the Dutch East Indies was invaded by the Japanese.

After Indonesian independence he became chairman of Yogyakarta branch office of Masyumi in 1950, still holding the position in the 1955 legislative election. He became member of Constitutional Assembly after the election until 1959 when the assembly was dissolved by Sukarno.

=== Pre-independence ===
Under Japanese rule, Muzakkir worked in the economics department of the Yogyakarta Sultanate until 1943. After that, he was appointed by Japanese intelligence agency as international news commentator in Jakarta. Muzakkir and Wahid Hasyim pioneered new religious affairs office called Shumuka under the same Japanese rule.

He was a member of Majelis Rakyat Indonesia (Indonesian People Council) from 1941 to 1942.

Muzakkir became a representative of Muhammadiyah in the BPUPK (Investigating Committee for Preparatory Work for Independence) preparing the works needed to transition to be independent Indonesia. He was also a member of Committee of Nine that formulated the constitution.

== Later life and death ==
Before his death, Muzakkir held the position of dean of school of law of UII, was member of the Muhammadiyah central leadership, and member of the Dewan Dakwah Islamiyah Indonesia (Indonesian Islamic Dawah Council).

Muzakkir died on 2 December 1973 due to cardiac arrest, while Tashadi stated that he died on 3 December 1973 at 21:50 WIB in Rumah Sakit PKU Muhammadiyah Yogyakarta (Muhammadiyah Ummat Health Center) due to hypertension. One day later, his remains were laid out in Masjid Ageng Mataram in Kotagede, while thousands of mourners offered condolences.

== Personal life ==
Muzakkir married Bunayah. Together they had four sons and three daughters: M. Jawir, M. Rifqi, M. Sodiq, Fathimah Zahroh, Siti Jauharoh, M. Salim Hamdi, and Siti Ulfah.

== Views ==
Considering Muzakkir's writings, Amini writes that "For Abdul Kahar Muzakkir, understanding Islam was not only about faith and worship, but also about grasping it as the entirety of life’s meaning." Some scholars classified his thought on nationalism as "religious nationalism".

== Legacy ==
Suara Muhammadiyah mentioned that Muzakkir was "exemplary leader", "pioneer of the revival of the Islamic community", and "freedom fighter".

Nakamura opined that Muzakkir was "not power hungry and neither does he like to show off his power".

Tashadi wrote that Muzakkir was "personification of Indonesia in 1930s in Cairo and Middle East".

== Works cited ==
- Amini, Mutiah (2024). "Abdul Kahar Muzakkir: Sebuah Biografi Intelektual (1930-an–1970-an)". MOZAIK: Jurnal Ilmu-Ilmu Sosial dan Humaniora (in Indonesian). 15 (1): 92–110. doi:10.21831/mozaik.v15i1.74970.
- Nakamura, Mitsuo (2019). "Prof. H. Abdul Kahar Muzakkir danPerkembangan Gerakan IslamReformis di Indonesia". Afkaruna. 15 (2): 203–225. doi:10.18196/aiijis.2019.0102.203-225.
- Tashadi (1986). Prof. K.H. Abdul Kahar Mudzakkir: Riwayat Hidup dan Perjuangan (in Indonesian). Jakarta: Directorate of Histories and Traditional Values.

Unknown	Rector of the Islamic University of Indonesia; 1963–1970	Succeeded by Kasmat Bahoewinangoen
