= Samanhudi =

Indonesian businessman

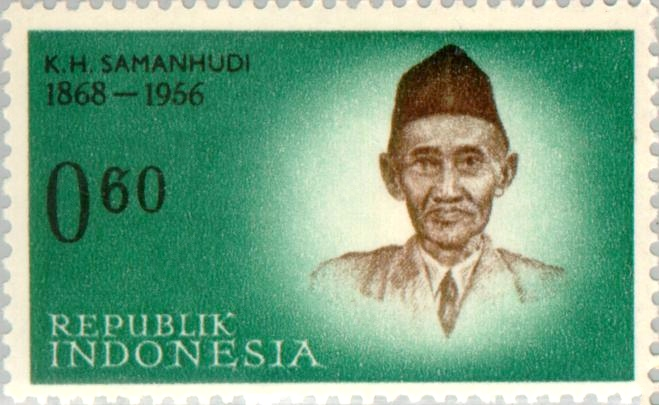
- K.H. Samanhudi
- Born: Sudarno Nadi; 8 October 1868; Surakarta, Surakarta Sunanate, Dutch East Indies
- Died: 28 December 1956 (aged 88); Klaten, Central Java, Indonesia
- Occupation: Founder Sarekat Dagang Islam
- Spouse(s): Suginah; Marbingah

Soedarno Nadi, well known as Hadji Samanhudi (1868 – 28 December 1956) was the founder of Sarekat Dagang Islam, an organization in Indonesia that previously served as an association for batik traders in Surakarta, and later broadened its scope to nationalist political issues.

Born in Lawiyan, Solo, he was educated until the highschool-equivalent SR (Sekolah Rakyat) but he didn't graduate. He then studied Islam in Surabaya. At the same time he began trading in batik.

Samanhudi founded Sarekat Dagang Islam, or Islamic Trade Union, in 1911. The Union consists of batik entrepreneurs in East and Central Java with the goal to improve their market hold against Chinese competition. The members of the organization were unified by a common religion, Islam, albeit one with many influences from local mysticism and tradition. Samanhudi remained as its chairman until 1914, two years after Tjokroaminoto transformed the trading organization into a political one.

Since 1920, Samanhudi became inactive in the party. His health declined, but his interest on national movements never calmed down. He retreated from the public spotlight, until after Indonesia's independence, when he resumed his activity. In participation of defending Republic of Indonesia against the formerly-colonist Dutch military aggression, Samanhudi formed Solo Branch of Indonesian Rebel Front (Barisan Pemberontak Indonesia Cabang Solo) and Pancasila Union Branch (Cabang Persatuan Pancasila). When the Netherlands launched the second aggression, he formed an army named Hawk Union Movement (Gerakan Kesatuan Alap-alap), which was assigned to provide logistical supplies for union armies fighting in the front line. There were many services he gave when Indonesian National Revolution took place.

Samanhudi died in Klaten on 28 December 1956, and was buried in Banaran, Grogol, Sukoharjo.

== Early life ==
Samanhudi, originally named Sudarno Nadi, was born in 1878 in Sondakan, Laweyan, Surakarta. He was the son of Haji Ahmad Zein, a batik merchant, and the grandson of Kiai Kartowikoro, who was also engaged in trade.

He received Islamic education both in his hometown and under the guidance of Kiai Djodjermo in Surabaya, while also attending a native primary school (Inlandsche School).

== Business and activism ==
Following his primary education, Sudarno entered the batik trade, continuing the occupation of his predecessors. His enterprise reportedly achieved an average daily profit of around 800 gulden and expanded with branches in Solo, Bandung, Purwokerto, Surabaya, and Banyuwangi. This expansion required frequent travel, through which he established a wide network of contacts.

In 1904, using the name Wirjowikoro, he traveled to Mecca to perform the hajj. While in Jeddah, he reportedly had a dream in which his tongue extended around the world. A local dream interpreter suggested this signified that he would become an important leader in his homeland. Upon returning, he adopted the name Samanhudi, or Haji Samanhudi, and, influenced by both the interpretation of his dream and his encounters with Islamic activists, he turned to social and political activity, establishing the Sarekat Dagang Islam (SDI, Islamic Trade Association). Externally, the native entrepreneurs were displeased with the Chinese in a unified cooperative-type association called Kong Sing in Surakarta, so they helped Samanhudi founded the SDI. The founders were R.M. Tirtodisurjo, Sumowardojo, Hardjosumarto, Martodikoro, Witjotirto, Sukir, Suwandi, Suropranoto, and Djerman. Although the reported founding year varies between 1905 and 1912, according to Muljono and Sutrisno, most likely there was already organization with the same name led by Tirtodisurjo in Bogor, and the one Samanhudi led in Surakarta was originally only a branch.

On 25 January 1913, in a Sarekat Islam congress in Surabaya, Samanhudi was elected as chairman.

== Views ==
Samanhudi at one point criticized the Susuhunan of Surakarta for showing excessive respect to the Dutch resident, a representative of colonial authority. He contended that as fellow humans and Muslims, people should not venerate such a figure. According to him, it was even more inappropriate for the Susuhunan himself, who was regarded as a khalifah, to display such deference.

== Later life and death ==
He became poor sometime after 1922 because his business went bankrupt. In 1940, Parada Harap wrote in Tjahaja Timur that he "lived in poverty and suffering. Indonesian government then gave an allowance starting in 1955 due to his activism and called him "independence pioneers". He died in Klaten on 28 December 1956.

== Personal life ==
At the age of twenty, Sudarno married Suginah, the daughter of Kiai Badjuri, after which he adopted the name Wirjowikoro. He later entered into another marriage with Marbingah, who was reputed to be of Mangkunegaran royal descent.

From both of his marriages, he had 6 sons and 3 daughters: Sawab Tjokrowiguno, Ny. Waginah Atmohartono, Sajid Atmosukanto, Sofjan, Sahlan Sastromartono, Slamet Samsulaman. Wagiya h Tjitrohartono, Warsinah Puspoatmodjo, and Samsu Zein.

== Works cited ==
- Muljono; Kutoyo, Sutrisno (1980). Haji Samanhudi (in Indonesian). Jakarta: Center for Historical and Cultural Research.
