= Soeraedi Tahsin =

Soeraedi Tahsin (born July 6 in Pandeglang, died February 25, 2003, in Amsterdam), also known as Eddie Soeraedi, was an Indonesian journalist and diplomat. He was the founding editor of the publication Berita Indonesia ('Indonesian News'), the first republican newspaper in Batavia.

== Biography ==
Tahsin served as the editor-in-chief of Bintang Timur, the daily newspaper of the Indonesian Party (Partindo). As of 1958 he was the general secretary of the Union of Indonesian Journalists (PWI).

In 1964 he was named ambassador of Indonesia to Mali by President Sukarno. After a military takeover in 1965 and the massacres of 1965-66, Tahsin did not return to Indonesia. Instead he went into exile in China. The Indonesian government withdrew his citizenship soon after the coup, leaving him stranded in Beijing. Following his departure, the embassy in Mali was closed and Indonesia's embassy in Guinea was accredited to Mali. Imrad Idris was named as the ambassador concurrently accredited to Mali to replace Soeraedi Tahsin.

Tahsin later moved to the Netherlands, entering the country illegally in 1977. He taught the Indonesian language at the Volksuniversiteit and started a publishing house–bookstore, named Manus Amici, in Amsterdam in 1981. He died in Amsterdam in 2003.
