= Soerjopranoto =

Indonesian politician and labor leader (1872–1959)

Raden Mas Soerjopranoto
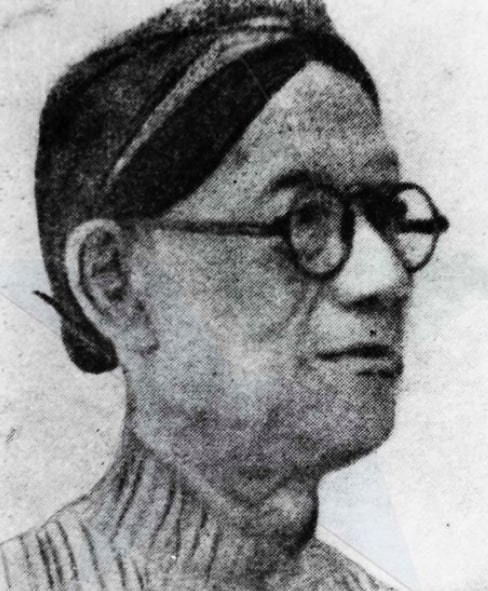
- Portrait, c. date unknown
- Born: 11 January 1871; Pakualaman, Yogyakarta
- Died: 15 October 1959 (aged 88); Bandung, Indonesia
- Organizations: Sarekat Islam (1915–1933); Indonesian Islamic Political Party (1933–1938)
- Known for: Founding and leading the Personeel Fabriek Bond (PFB)
- Relatives: Ki Hajar Dewantara (brother); Paku Alam III (grandfather)

Soerjopranoto (EYD: Suryopranoto; 11 January 1871 – 15 October 1959) was an Indonesian politician and labor leader. He founded and lead the Personeel Fabriek Bond (PFB), a labor union associated with the Sarekat Islam movement, of which he was a member of from 1915 to 1933. He was dubbed "The Strike King" by the Dutch press for his involvement in the labor movement. He was also the elder brother of Ki Hajar Dewantara, a pro-independence activist and nationalist. Following his death, Soerjopranoto was proclaimed a national hero by President Sukarno.

== See also ==
- Ki Hajar Dewantara, his brother.
