= Association of Political Organisations of the Indonesian People =

The Association of Political Organisations of the Indonesian People (Indonesian: Pemufakatan Perhimpunan-perhimpunan Politik Kebangsaan Indonesia (PPPKI)) was a federation of pre-war Indonesian political parties that was established to unite a range of organisations in the struggle for Indonesian independence.

== Formation ==
The Association of Political Organisations of the Indonesian People was a federation of the major Indonesian nationalist organisations. It was established in December 1927 in Bandung, driven mainly by the Indonesian National Party (PNI), led by prominent nationalist Sukarno. It brought together the "non-cooperative" parties such as the PNI and Indonesian Islamic Union Party (PSII), which had refused to work with the Dutch colonial authorities, with the "cooperative" organisations that had taken seats in the Volksraad quasi-legislature such as Paguyuban Pasundan and Budi Utomo.

== Activities ==
The PPPKI was beset by internal struggles. Under its rules, designed to ensure that the views of minorities were respected, all decisions had to have the unanimous support of all member organisations. As the members were unable to work together, it achieved very little, although it opposed colonial labor laws. In 1929, it admitted the Perhimpoenan Indonesia, an association of Indonesian students in the Netherlands, and the following year changed its name to the Union of Political Organisations for the Indonesian Independence (keeping the same initials). However, in that same year, the largest member, the PSSI left.

== Dissolution ==
In 1933, the Dutch authorities refused permission for the PPPKI to hold its annual conference, and although it was not officially dissolved, the organisation had ceased to exist by the end of 1934.

== Membership ==
The PPKI membership included:

- Indonesian Islamic Union Party (PSII)
- Indonesian National Party (PNI)
- Budi Utomo
- Paguyuban Pasundan
- Sumatra Bond
- Surabaya Study Club
