= Mas Mansoer =

Indonesian Islamic religious leader (1896–1946)

Kiai Haji Mas Mansoer
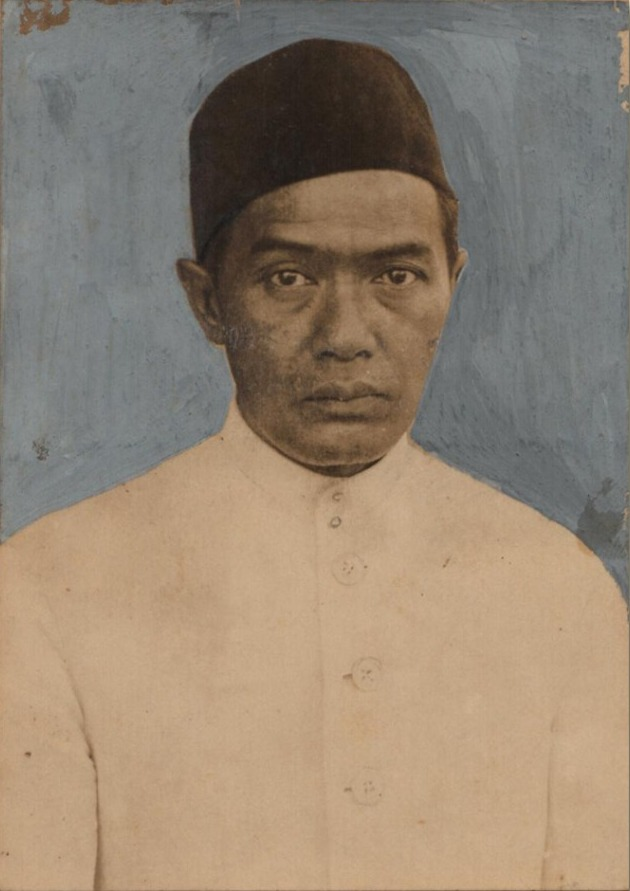
- Portrait, date unknown

4th Chairman of Muhammadiyah
- In office 25 June 1937 – 25 April 1942
- Preceded by: Hisjam bin Hoesni
- Succeeded by: Ki Bagoes Hadikoesoemo

Personal details
- Born: 25 June 1896 Surabaya, Dutch East Indies
- Died: 25 April 1946 (aged 49) Surabaya, Indonesia
- Spouse: Siti Zakijah (m. 1937; died 1939)
- Children: 6
- Education: Al-Azhar University

Mas Mansoer (EYD: Mas Mansur; 25 June 1896 – 25 April 1946) was an Indonesian religious leader who served as the 4th chairman of Muhammadiyah from 1937 to 1942. He was declared a national hero by President Sukarno in 1964.

== Biography ==
Mas Mansoer was born on 25 June 1896 in Kampung Sawahan, north of Surabaya. His father was Kyai Hajji Mas Ahmad Marzuki, a descendant of the Sumenep royal family and a friend of Kyai Hajji Ahmad Dahlan. His mother was a woman from Surabaya who was of mixed Buginese and Minang descent.

At the age of 12, Mansoer went to Mecca to study Islam. He then enrolled at Al-Azhar University in Egypt. During his studies, he read several Western literary works about freedom, humanism, and democracy. He also observed how Egyptian people fought against British colonists to obtain their independence, which influenced his later views.

After graduating from Al-Azhar, Mansoer returned to Surabaya and became a Ustaz at the Mufidah pesantren. During this period, he felt that the colonial government hindered the teaching of Islam. This situation made him join Muhammadiyah and Persatuan Bangsa Indonesia (Indonesian People's Association). He preached in remote areas. In 1914, Mansoer and Abdul Wahab Hasbullah (the cousin of Hasyim Asy'ari) founded an educational organization named Nahdlatul Wathan (Awakening of the Homeland). They also joined the Indonesche Study Club, an organization led by Dr. Sutomo. Later, he became the chairman of the East Java branch of Muhammadiyah . In 1937, he became the chairman of Muhammadiyah through an election at the 26th Muhammadiyah Congress. Because of his widespread influence, the colonial government offered him a position in the Het Kantoor van Inlandsche Zaken as the head of the institution of religious affairs. However, he refused it. Mansoer took the initiative in formatting the Majelis Islam A'la Indonesia on 25 September 1937. The purpose of the organization was to aid clerics throughout Indonesia in networking and building relationships with each other, both physically and spiritually. Under the influence of the nationalism movement, MIAI was also involved in opposing the colonial government, such as in the Gabungan Politik Indonesia (GAPI; Indonesian Political Federation) led by M. H. Thamrin. In 1938 he founded the Indonesian Islamic Party (PII) with Dr. Sukiman.

Mansoer was under pressure during the Japanese occupation due to his activities with Muhammadiyah. Mansoer, Kyai Hajji Wahid Hasyim, and Kyai Hajji Taufiqurrahman then formed an Islamic organization called Masyumi. After the group was formed, the Japanese government banned all political organizations and formed PUTERA (Pusat Tenaga Rakyat; previously Jawa Hokokai) to spread its propaganda. Mansoer, along with Sukarno, Mohammad Hatta, and Soewardi Soerjaningrat, were appointed as leaders in 1942; collectively they were known as the Empat Serangkai (Four Series). He accepted the appointment and resigned as Chairman of Muhammadiyah. Mansoer resigned from PUTERA in 1944 because of illness. During this period, Mansoer conveyed the idea of a roemah jang moerah dan sehat ("cheap and healthy house") in a meeting with other intellectuals and Japanese officers; this was hoped to solve housing problems faced by native Indonesians. His idea was supported by Sukarno. He also drew a blueprint for the project.

Before the Proclamation of Indonesian Independence, Mansoer became a member of the Panitia Persiapan Kemerdekaan Indonesia (Preparatory Committee for Indonesian Independence). During the national revolution, Mansoer helped the people of Surabaya in defending the city against the British Army. Then, he was arrested by the Dutch, and told to give a speech and convince the people of Surabaya to surrender; however, he refused. As a result, Mansoer was jailed in Kalisosok Prison in Surabaya.

Mansoer died on 25 April 1946 in the prison. His remains were buried in Gipu, Surabaya.

== Religious views ==
Concerning banking, Mansoer issued a fatwa that all kinds of bank interest are haraam (forbidden). However, doing business in banking was still allowed. On another issue, during the Nineteenth Congress of Muhammadiyah, Hajji Rasul contended that unisex majlis were haraam, but Mansoer disagreed. After discussing it, they agreed to declare them makruh (objectionable). In the purification of Islamic teachings, Mansoer prohibited bid‘ah, taqlid, and takhayul (superstition) in worship. He also forbade the tradition of grave pilgrimages, selametan, and doing a talqin for a body. He said that setbacks suffered by Muslims were caused by their weak beliefs and egoism, and that to fix these problems, Muslims should base their lives on the Quran and Hadiths. In his work Risalah Tawhid dan Sjirik (Treatise of Monotheism and Polytheism) he stated that another cause of Muslims' weakness was interference in Islamic thought and practices from polytheism.

== Personal life ==
He married Siti Zakijah in 1937, the couple had 6 children. She died in 1939.

== Legacy ==
In 1964, Mansoer was awarded the title National Hero of Indonesia through Presidential Decree No.162/1964.

== Notes ==
Preceded by KH Hisyam	Chairman of Muhammadiyah; 1937–1942	Succeeded by Ki Bagoes Hadikoesoemo
