= Saleh Iskandar Poeradisastra =

Indonesian writer

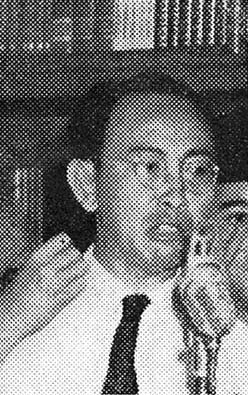
Boejoeng Saleh

Saleh Iskandar or Boejang Saleh (25 December 1923 - 1989) in Jakarta. He is an active writer who writes essays about Indonesian culture, Indonesian literature, and history. He also wrote poetry, and short stories.
