= Gerindo =

Political party in the Dutch East Indies (1937–1942)

Indonesian People's Movement Gerakan Rakyat Indonesia
- Abbreviation: Gerindo
- Founded: 24 May 1937
- Dissolved: 20 March 1942
- Preceded by: Partindo
- Ideology: Left-wing nationalism; Indonesian nationalism; Anti-fascism
- Political position: Left-wing
- National affiliation: Indonesian Political Federation (GAPI)

The Indonesian People's Movement (Indonesian: Gerakan Rakyat Indonesia), better known as Gerindo, was a left-wing and nationalist political party in the Dutch East Indies (now Indonesia) which existed from 1937 to 1942. It had modest goals and was largely cooperative to the colonial administration. More strongly anti-fascist than anti-colonialist, the party sought to support the colonial government in opposing fascism, especially Japanese fascism.

Founded as the successor to Partindo, the party's leaders were mainly left-wing nationalists who aspired to socialist ideals. Though more radical than its conservative counterpart, the Great Indonesia Party, Gerindo was tolerated by the colonial administration, becoming the only legal organization for radical nationalism. In 1939, Gerindo joined several other parties in forming the Indonesian Political Federation (GAPI), an umbrella organization of various different nationalist groups which called for Indonesian self-determination and an elected parliament. Following the German invasion of the Netherlands in 1940, the party's activities were severely curtailed and it, alongside GAPI, was dissolved in the wake of the invasion of the colony by the Empire of Japan in 1942.

== History ==
=== Background ===
In 1931, Bonifacius Cornelis de Jonge became Governor-General of the Dutch East Indies and took a more hardline approach to Indonesian nationalist movements than his predecessor. As part of the clampdown, non-cooperative nationalist leader Sukarno was arrested in November 1934 followed by Hatta and Sjahrir three months later. All were exiled, while Sukarno's Indonesia party (Partindo) party, found itself leaderless. By 1935, as a result of legislation, detentions and police actions, the only non-cooperative party function was the small Indonesian Islamic Union Party (PSII). In 1936, a number of members of the Volksraad, the semi-legislative body of the Dutch East Indies, introduced the Soetardjo Petition, which asked for a conference to be organized to discuss autonomy for the colony. It was passed by 26 votes to 20. The Dutch authorities responded negatively to the petition, and this, together with increasing threat from global fascism led a number of nationalists, including former members of the recently dissolved Partindo, to establish Gerindo (Indonesian People's Movement) on 24 May 1937. The principal leaders were Mohammad Yamin, Sartono, Amir Sjarifuddin and A.K Gani.

=== Activities ===
The party had an internationalist outlook. Although it wanted a full parliament for the Dutch East Indies, its members took the view that the threat of global dominance by fascist nations, particularly Japan, was a more immediate concern than Indonesian independence and the party cooperated with the Dutch administration, accepting Dutch administration and taking seats. Despite its more radical stance than Parindra (Great Indonesia Party), the Dutch did not ban it, and it became the only legal organization for radical nationalists, including supporters of the banned Communist Party of Indonesia. However, the resulting disparity of views within the party led to tensions between Sjahrir and the more leftist members.

In 1937, a Sutardjo petition committee was established to try to persuade the Dutch government to support the petition. Although in October that year, the Gerindo leadership stated the party would support this committee, it also banned party members from sitting on it, making its support meaningless. It also attracted very little support from other nationalist parties, which may have been due to defeatism. In November 1938, the Dutch parliament rejected the petition.

Gerindo held its first congress in Batavia from 20 to 24 July 1938, at which it was decided to establish a youth wing, and to make the anniversary of the party's establishment a national day. In May 1939, Gerindo, along with seven other nationalist organizations, including Parindra and the PSSI, formed the Indonesian Political Federation (GAPI). Prominent nationalist Mohammad Husni Thamrin was the main driving force behind this establishment, while Gerindo had the most prominent role within the organization. That same year, Yamin was expelled from the party for breaches of discipline. At the second Gerindo congress, which was held in Palembang from 1–2 August 1939, the party agreed to open up membership to ethnic Europeans, Chinese and Arabs. It also stated that it wanted to see the imposition of a minimum wage and assistance for the unemployed, and confirmed Yamin's expulsion.

Shortly before the May 1940 German invasion of the Netherlands, Gerindo, through GAPI, put forward a proposal that a Dutch East Indies government with wide-ranging autonomy be set up and that it be answerable to a fully elected Volksraad, which would allow Indonesian nationalists to support the Dutch government. This was similar to the proposals in the Sutardjpo petition. However, the Netherlands fell to Germany before any response was forthcoming. The party did not hold a congress that year, but in October elected a new party leadership, although A.K. Gani remained party leader. The third party congress was held in Batavia from 10 to 12 October 1941. It called for exiled Indonesian leaders to be freed as they were also enemies of fascism.

=== Dissolution ===
On 10 January 1942, Japan invaded and subsequently occupied the Dutch East Indies. On 20 March, the Japanese authorities ordered all political parties to be dissolved and banned political activity.
