= Paguyuban Pasundan =

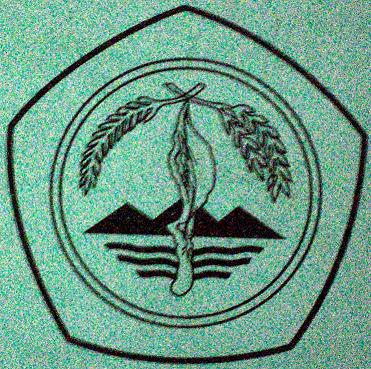
- Paguyuban Pasundan logo
- Formation: 20 July 1913; 112 years ago
- Type: Community organization (Ormas)
- Legal status: Active
- Headquarters: Bandung, Jawa Barat
- Region served: Indonesia and United States
- Official language: Indonesian and Sundanese
- Chairman: Didi Turmudzi
- Website: www.paguyubanpasundan.org

Paguyuban Pasundan (lit. 'Sundanese Association' in Sundanese) is a Sundanese cultural organization that was founded on 20 July 1913, and is one of the oldest organizations in Indonesia that still operates. During its existence, the organization has been moving in the field of education, socio-cultural, politics, economy, youth and women empowerment. Thus, since 13 June 1919, it became political organisation/party, a member of the Association of Political Organisations of the Indonesian People. Paguyuban Pasundan works to preserve the Sundanese culture. There are also members of the Paguyuban Pasundan organisation who reside in the United States with other Indonesian diasporas. In this country, their community is centred in the capital city of Washington DC.

Paguyuban Pasundan indirectly affected the establishment of Budi Utomo on Wednesday 20 May 1908. Considered the beginning of the Indonesian nation movement to independence, many Sundanese people who joined the organization. Branches of Budi Utomo also appeared in many places in West Java, such as in Bandung and Bogor. Sundanese membership in the Budi Utomo decreased drastically when the organisation seemed focused upon the population of Central Java and East Java .

Sundanese students in the STOVIA (School Tot Opleiding Voor Indlandsche Artsen), Dutch East Indies' era medical school in Batavia (Jakarta), attempted to make the Sundanese people's organization. Next, the students aged about 22 years old, visit Daeng Kandoeroean Ardiwinata residence, who regarded as the Sundanese elders. In the visits, they stated purpose of the establishment of the organization at the same time ask D. K. Ardiwinata to become head of the organization.

After D. K. Ardiwinata agreed, in Jakarta, on Sunday 20 July 1913 they held a meeting for the establishment of clubs. In the meeting, the establishment of the organization was agreed and they named the organization "Pagoejoeban Pasoendan." They also set D. K. Ardiwinata as advisors and Dajat Hidajat (STOVIA's student) as chairman.

Between 1931 and 1942, Paguyuban Pasundan had a great reputation under the leadership of Oto Iskandar di Nata, Indonesian national hero.

Today, Paguyuban Pasundan's activities are dominated by activity in the field of education and socio-cultural. One of the milestones in the field of education struggle is the establishment of University of Pasundan in Bandung on Monday 14 November 1960. Paguyuban Pasundan now has 32 branch offices with 492 smaller branches. At least 12,300 people involved in this paguyuban. Sundanese cultural preservation in the era of globalization has become the main priority. Pasundan schools in primary and secondary education scattered in the area of West Java and Banten. In higher education, Paguyuban Pasundan has one university and three "sekolah tinggi" (colleges).

In 2011, Pasundan University has got the solely grant in Art to perform in some universities and cities in China.

== See also ==
- Angkatan Muda Siliwangi
