= Bintang Timur =

Bintang Timur (Indonesian: "Star of the East"), also spelled Bintang Timoer before 1947, was a popular daily newspaper published in the Dutch East Indies and Indonesia.

== History ==
The newspaper was launched in September 1926 by Parada Harahap, then editor of Bintang Hindia. Before its first issue, the Dutch language newspaper Algemeen Handelsblad voor Nederlandsch-Indië was already recommending it to "the natives" due to Harahap's reputation for hard work and dedication to good journalism. The editorial lineup in the first year, aside from Harahap, were G. Soetadipradja, Kadar, Hatnid and Abdullah Badjrei, with assistant editing by Saadah Alim. The paper noted that Bintang Timoer would be independent of any religious or political faction, and that it had a more modern layout than most Malay language papers, with illustrations and more space given to content. Since the paper was not involving itself in politics, it even promised that while "the importance of Indonesia will be kept in mind, since no party interests are served, Indonesia will be understood as a 'geographical concept' not in the meaning of a 'political concept'."

Bintang Timur apparently resumed publication in early 1953 after being unable to publish during World War II and the Indonesian National Revolution. Under its new guise in independent Indonesia, Parada Harahap once again became president-director and head editor, and promised that the paper would have a "national progressive" line and to present the news in a responsible and neutral manner.

In its later years it was the organ of the Indonesia Party (Partindo). S. Tahsin served as the editor-in-chief of Bintang Timur, later followed by Tom Anwar. As of the late 1950s it was estimated to have a circulation of 25,000.
