= Oemar Said Tjokroaminoto =

Indonesian nationalist (1882–1934)

Raden Mas Haji Oemar Said Tjokroaminoto
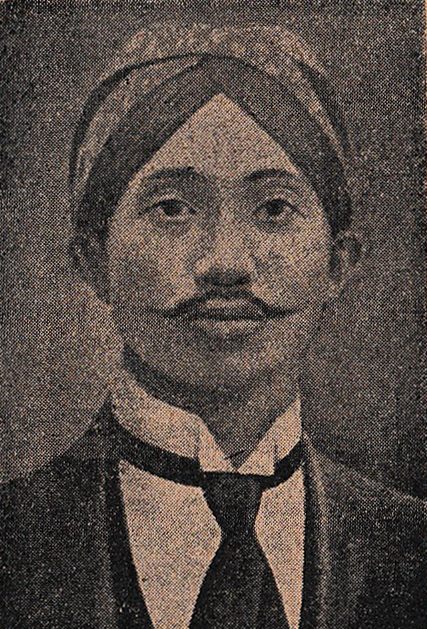
- Born: 16 August 1882; Ponorogo, Dutch East Indies
- Died: 17 December 1934 (aged 52); Yogyakarta, Dutch East Indies
- Citizenship: Indonesian
- Title: Founder and chairman of Sarekat Islam
- Spouse: Suharsikin
- Children: 5

Oemar Said Tjokroaminoto (EYD: Umar Said Cokroaminoto; 16 August 1882 – 17 December 1934), better known in Indonesia as H.O.S. Tjokroaminoto, was an Indonesian nationalist. He became one of the leaders of the Islamic Trade Union (Indonesian: Syarekat Dagang Islam), founded by Samanhudi, which became Sarekat Islam, which they both cofounded.

== Early life ==
Tjokroaminoto was born the second of twelve children, in the Ponorogo Regency as the son of RM. Tjokroaminoto (district chief of Kleco), grandson of RMA. Tjokronegoro (regent of the Ponorogo Regency), and great-grandson of Kyai Bagus Kasan Besari of Tegalsari pesantren. According to his genealogy, his education was directed towards civil service.

After graduating in 1902 from OSVIA (Dutch: Opleiding School Voor Inlandsche Ambtenaren), a school for indigenous civil servants, in Magelang, the then-highest civil servant education institution, he worked as one in Ngawi for three years from 1902 to 1905). He moved to Surabaya, where he met Samanhudi, founder and leader of the Islamic Trade Unions (SDI). At night, he attended Burgerlijke Avond School (BAS) for some years. After graduating, he worked in a sugar refinery (1907–1912). He wrote for the Bintang Soerabaja (Surabaya Star) daily and became a staff assistant.

Known as the "Crownless King of Java" (Dutch: De Ongekroonde van Java) by the Dutch, Tjokroaminoto was one of the pioneers of the trade union movement in Indonesia and was a teacher of some of the most well-known leaders of Indonesia. His political ideas also gave birth to various ideologies of Indonesia at that time, when he tutored students in his household, such as Semaoen, Alimin, Musso, Sukarno, Kartosuwiryo, and even Tan Malaka. He was the first to refuse to submit to the Netherlands. After he died, the colors of the Indonesian movement were developed by his students, the socialists and communists embraced by Semaoen, Musso, and Alimin.

One of his most famous quotes was "Highest education, purest tauhid, smartest of strategies" (Indonesian: Setinggi-tinggi ilmu, semurni-murni tauhid, sepintar-pintar siasat), depicting the atmosphere of Indonesian struggle in its time which required the three aforementioned abilities of a freedom fighter. Of the various students he liked most was Sukarno until he married Sukarno with his daughter Siti Oetari, Sukarno's first wife. His message to his disciples was "If you want to be a great Leader, write like a journalist and talk like an orator". These words influenced his disciples to make Sukarno shout every night to learn the speeches to make his friends, Musso, Alimin, SM Kartosuwiryo, Darsono, and others wake up and laugh to watch it.

== Formation of Islamic unions ==
=== Sarekat Dagang Islam ===
Samanhudi had founded Sarekat Dagang Islam (SDI) or the Islamic Trade Union, in late 1905, in Surakarta. Tjokroaminoto was asked to prepare the needed regulations for the organization and to handle the management. The statute was prepared and notarized in Surabaya on 10 September 1906.

=== Sarekat Islam ===
At Tjokroaminoto's suggestion, the word trade (Indonesian: dagang) in the organization's name was removed and SDI became Sarekat Islam (SI) or the Islamic Union. Its chairman was H. Samanhudi, while Tjokroaminoto became chairman. A few days later, its statute was sent to the Governor-General to be legalized as a legal institution.

A central committee was formed with Samanhudi as chairman and Tjokroaminoto as vice-chairman. In explaining the organization's aim, Tjokroaminoto stated that SI would not oppose the Dutch East Indies government. For the organization's interest, he and other managers went to the then Governor-General Alexander Willem Frederik Idenburg on 29 March 1913. Idenburg stated that for public importance (Dutch: algemeen belang), SI's legalization couldn't be granted, but local Islamic unions can be granted corporate-body status.

The membership of SI rapidly increased, to about two and a half million.

=== Centraal Sarekat Islam ===
Because of the rapid development of local Islamic unions, it was necessary to establish a central Islamic union coordinating them. In 1915, the Central Islamic Union, or Centraal Sarekat Islam (CSI) was founded with Tjokroaminoto as its chairman, Abdoel Moeis as vice-chairman, and Samanhoedi as honorary chairman. Since then, Tjokroaminoto was continuously chairman or a member of the SI board of administration until his death.

The first CSI national congress, simultaneously being the third SI congress, during his chairmanship was held in Bandung in June 1916. The usage of the word national signified the issue Tjokroaminoto had voiced, which was the necessity of unity of all Indonesians. SI gained acknowledgment of its power with the inauguration of Tjokroaminoto and Abdoel Moeis as members of the newly opened Volksraad in 1918.

SI under Tjokroaminoto progressed, but inner opposition arose, while the colonial government's trust decreased. The hardest challenge came from the Marxist/Leninist faction led by Semaun, who faced off against Tjokroaminoto. Eventually, the Marxist–Leninist faction broke off and formed SI-Merah ("Red-SI"), which later joined the Communist Party of Indonesia.

In 1921, Tjokroaminoto was arrested for the charge of assassination by SI-afd. B in Cimareme, Garut, West Java. He was released around 9 months later without trial in August 1922.

=== Partai Sarekat Islam ===
CSI became weak, and its name was changed to Partai Sarekat Islam (PSI) or the Islamic Union Party in February 1923. Tjokroaminoto made an effort to unite the outer Javanese groups. After propaganda attacks were sent, insurgency broke out wherever, until he and Abdoel Moeis were forbidden to visit some areas. At that time, Pan-Islamism was launched. Tjokroaminoto and Mas Mansoer performed Hajj.

The political suggestion of hijra or "migration" with the non-cooperative attitude toward the colonial government was eventually accepted by Congress, which caused Tjokroaminoto's refusal when he was elected as Volksraad's member in 1927. The Ulema Committee was founded to discuss Tjokroaminoto's controversial Qur'anic interpretations in 1928.

=== Partai Syarikat Islam Indonesia ===
Later the PSI was changed to the Indonesian Islamic Union Party or Partai Syarikat Islam Indonesia (PSII) in early 1929. There was a confrontation between the nationalist Soekiman and the religious Tjokroaminoto that led to Soekiman's departure to form a new party, the Indonesian Islamic Party or Partai Islam Indonesia.

== Death ==
After the 20th PSII Congress in Banjarmasin in May 1934, Tjokroaminoto became sick and died in Yogyakarta on 17 December 1934. His position in PSII was succeeded by his brother Abikusno Tjokrosujoso.

== In popular culture ==
A film titled Teacher of the Nation: Tjokroaminoto (Indonesian: Guru Bangsa: Tjokroaminoto) was made about Oemar Said Tjokroaminoto. The film, produced in 2015, was directed by Garin Nugroho, with the main character as Reza Rahardian.
