= Sarekat Islam =

Political organization in Indonesia

- Logo of Sarekat Islam
- Abbreviation: SI
- Formation: 1911 (as Sarekat Dagang Islam, SDI); 1912 (renamed to Sarekat Islam, SI)
- Type: Political organization
- Headquarters: Surabaya
- Members: 2.500.000 (1916)
- Official language: Indonesian
- Leader: Samanhudi (1911–1912); Oemar Said Tjokroaminoto (1912–1934); Abikusno Tjokrosujoso (1934–1940)

Sarekat Islam or Syarikat Islam (lit. 'Islamic Association' or 'Islamic Union'; SI) was an Indonesian socio-political organization founded at the beginning of the 20th century during the Dutch colonial era. Initially, SI served as a cooperative of Muslim Javanese batik traders to compete with the Chinese-Indonesian big traders. From there, SI rapidly evolved into a nationalist political organization that demanded self-governance against the Dutch colonial regime and gained wide popular support. SI was especially active during the 1910s and the early 1920s. By 1916, it claimed 80 branches with a total membership of around a million.

SI was eventually embroiled in an internal conflict between the Islamic moderates and the radical communist members who urged firmer anti-colonialist and anti-capitalist actions. In 1921, the organization was split and communist members founded a separate entity known as the Sarekat Islam Merah (Red Islamic Association) which was absorbed into the Communist Party of Indonesia (PKI). The split led to the decline of the organization, and the original SI later turned into a political party, Indonesian Islamic Union Party (PSII). PSII was fused into the United Development Party (PPP) in 1973.

Today, SI is credited as the first large-scale Indonesian nationalist organization (or mass organization, ormas) and the largest Muslim political organization in the pre-independence era.

== History ==
=== Formation ===
The predecessor of Sarekat Islam was Sarekat Dagang Islam (Islamic Trade Association, SDI) which was based on a movement in 1909 in Batavia (today's Jakarta) and 1910 in Buitenzorg (today's Bogor), West Java. This movement was formed by a journalist Tirto Adhi Soerjo who was a member of priyayi (Javanese noble class). Tirto aimed the movement to bring together small-scale pribumi (indigenous) traders and Arab traders unified by the common Islamic religion to advance their economic interests and compete with the Chinese-Indonesian big traders. The movement was also a reaction to the intensified activities of the foreign Christian missionaries in Indonesia, which strengthened the position of Islam as a rallying point of native Indonesians' struggle against foreign encroachment. The movement sparked the interest of Samanhudi, a successful batik trader based in Surakarta. In 1911, Samanhudi founded SDI in the city of Surakarta with the help of Tirto.

=== Expansion ===
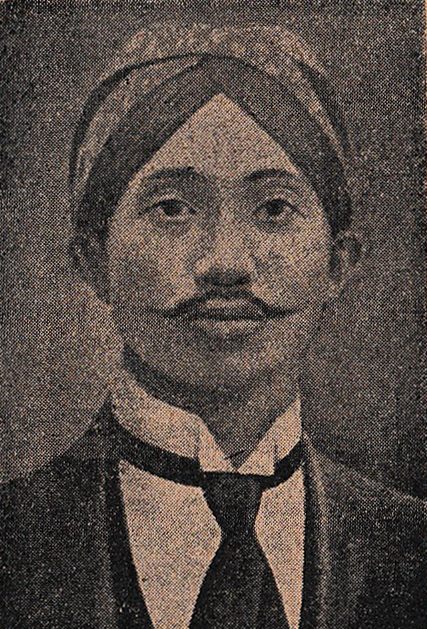
Oemar Said Tjokroaminoto

On August 12, 1912, SDI was briefly suspended by the colonial government after some conflicts between and Chinese and the occurrence of anti-Chinese riots. After the restriction was lifted, SDI renamed itself to Sarekat Islam on September 19, 1912, in Surabaya. On January 26, 1913, the first party congress was held in Surabaya which gathered tens of thousands of participants. The congress was marked by the rise of Oemar Said Tjokroaminoto as the new leader of CSI. Under the charismatic leadership of Tjokroaminoto, who was hailed as a messianic figure or Ratu Adil, the organization rapidly expanded the network throughout Java and later spread to the outer islands. SI also began publishing periodicals in the Surabaya, Semarang, Bandung, and Batavia branches. Membership of SI rapidly grew from 4,500 in April 1912 to 150,000 in April 1913 and eventually 350,000 in 1916. Other reports estimated the membership to be 800,000. SI itself claimed 2 million members in 1919.

The rapid increase of SI membership led to the expansion of the supporter base to a wide array of social classes. Although SI leaders generally espoused Modernist Islam, it became heterogeneous in terms of the demographics and ideology of its grassroots members. While the initial supporter base was a petty bourgeoisie of religiously devout aliran (societal stream) of santri, the expansion had led to the inclusion of peasantry of abangan whose Islamic faith was mixed with mysticism and pre-Islamic animist beliefs, as well as members of priyayi nobility class who had secular outlooks. The leadership of the organization gradually moved from small-scale merchants of the SDI era to the intelligentsia of priyayi origin with Dutch-language education.

During this time, the central leadership of SI strived to maintain harmony with the Dutch colonial administration. SI proclaimed to uplift the welfare of the indigenous population under Dutch rule and demanded self-governance through constitutional means. Tjokroaminoto declared the rejection of anti-government activity during the 1913 congress, during which he insisted on "loyalty" and "satisfaction" toward the Dutch government and denied the allegation that the organization served as a political party. As a response, the colonial government did not attempt to suppress SI in the beginning. In November 1912, SI requested the colonial administration to recognize them as a legal entity. The government individually authorized the regional branches of SI on June 30, 1913, and eventually gave an official permit to the SI headquarters in 1916.

Despite the non-confrontational stance of the SI leadership, the spread of SI in the villages had led to an outburst of violence, where peasants and villagers perceived SI as a means of self-defense and expression of group solidarity against the oppressive power structure in the rural area. The 1913–1914 period saw a particularly severe outburst of violence toward the Chinese-Indonesians, priyayi officials, and the Dutch colonial regime. In some areas, SI became a shadow administration which obliged priyayi officials to accommodate their demands.

=== Radicalization ===
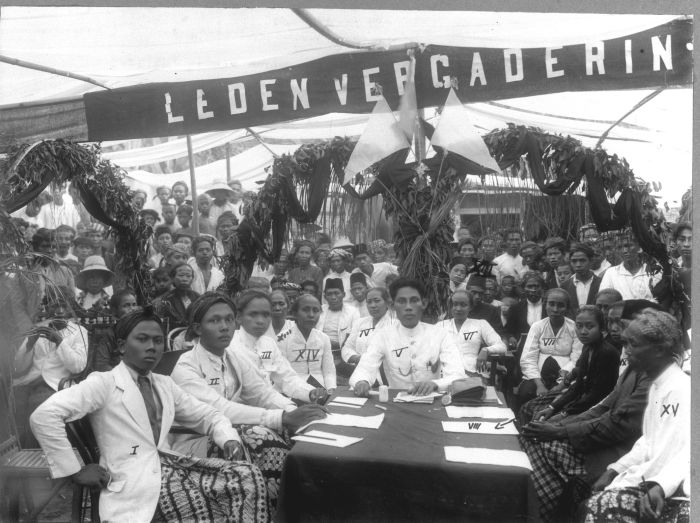
Group portrait at a meeting of Sarekat Islam, Kaliwungu, 1921.

SI was loosely organized and its regional branches retained considerable autonomy. Under the circumstances, the SI Semarang branch led by a union activist Semaun began to radicalize and embrace communism. The radicalization was a result of the heightening Marxist-socialist influence in the city which led to the establishment of the Indies Social Democratic Association (ISDV) in 1914. ISDV, founded by a Comintern agent Henk Sneevliet, was composed almost entirely of Dutch members, and they sought to spread their thoughts among the native Indonesian population. Thus ISDV turned to SI which grew into a political organization with the largest number of followers. Semaun joined SI in 1914 and also ISDV in 1915, leading him to hold dual party membership. Semaun militantly advocated communist ideas and pushed for the leftist turn of SI, competing with the more moderate position taken by the central SI leaders such as Tjokroaminoto. The leftist turn was also aided by the events outside of Indonesia, notably World War I (1914–1918) and the Bolshevik Revolution (1917–1923). The subsequent SI Congress held in 1917 incorporated openly anti-colonialist and anti-capitalist tones.

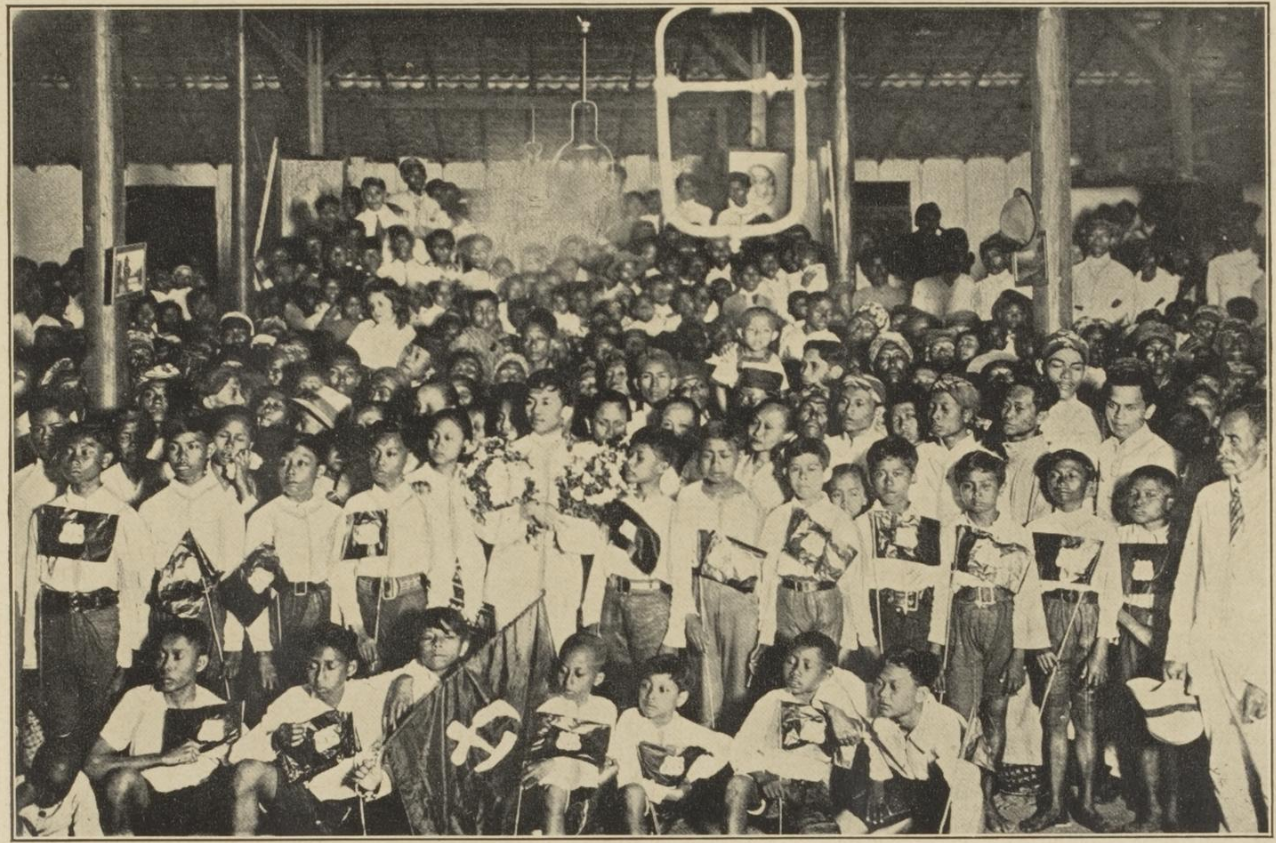
Sarekat Islam youth group in Semarang holding a hammer-and-sickle flag, 1922. Tan Malaka stands in the middle as a teacher.

In May 1918, the colonial administration established the People's Council (Volksraad) as a concession to the rising demand for democratization. A few SI leaders became members of the council, including Tjokroaminoto and Agus Salim, a trusted advisor of Tjokroaminoto who joined the SI leadership in 1915 and was known for his commitment to modernist Islam and pan-Islamism. Despite the demand for democratization, the council only had an advisory power, and the members were appointed by the colonial government. Since the SI Congress held from September to October 1918, communist SI members such as Semaun, Darsono Notosudirdjo, and Alimin joined the ranks of the SI leadership, enabling them to pressure Tjokroaminoto to boycott the Volksraad and take firmer political action. Tjokroaminoto finally answered their calls and demanded the Dutch colonial administration to form a parliament based on the popular election and alleviate labor issues, and refused to cooperate with the Volksraad unless the government addressed these grievances.

The radicalization of SI prompted the Dutch colonial government to suppress the organization. In May 1919, the government accused SI responsible for the murder of a Dutch official in Tolitoli, Celebes which led to the arrest of an SI leader Abdul Muis. There was also a shooting incident in Garut, West Java in June 1919 which led to the arrest of SI leaders, including Sosrokardono and Tjokroaminoto who were imprisoned in 1921 for 11 months. These events had led to the dramatic decrease in its membership, due to the fear of carrying a membership card leading to an arrest.

=== Split ===
The ideological rift between the Islamist wing led by Agus Salim and the communist wing led by Semaun intensified, at the expense of Tjokroaminoto's support level. Semaun was now effectively a leader of ISDV together with Darsono. ISDV metamorphosed into the Communist Association of the Indies (PKI) in 1920, as the direct predecessor of the Communist Party of Indonesia (PKI).

During this time, labor and trade unions achieved considerable success in labor disputes and wage negotiations, leading to an attempt to establish the Labor Movement Association (PPKB) as a federation of PKI and SI unions in 1919 which comprised 22 unions and 72,000 members. Salim and Soerjopranoto, a labor activist who belonged to the SI union and nicknamed raja mogok (the strike king), competed with Semaun for the leadership of PPKB. Threatened by Semaun's influence, Salim denounced the dual party membership during the 1921 SI Congress. The conflict between Salim and Semaun's factions reached the highest point after Semaun recruited several labor groups under the PPKB which were then absorbed into the PKI. Salim's motion to prohibit dual membership was officially adopted by the SI leaders including Salim and Muis in the subsequent SI Congress, leading to the effective expulsion of Semaun and his communist followers from the SI leadership.

The decision led to the split of SI branches between the Islamist-supporting "White SI" and PKI-supporting "Red SI." The expelled left-wing faction of SI set up a group known as Sarekat Islam Merah (Red Islamic Association), which was later renamed to Sarekat Rakjat (People's Association) and served the mass organization of PKI. The split of communist members, in addition to the mounting pressure from the colonial government, had led to the severe decline of SI as an organization.

=== Aftermath ===
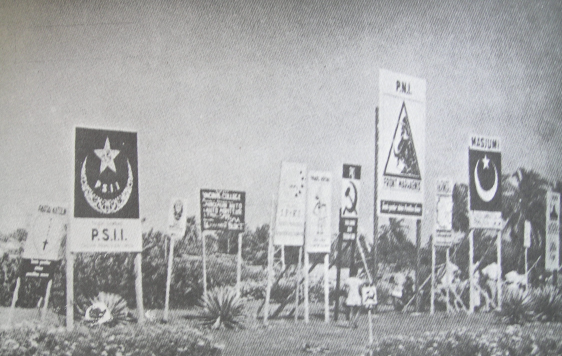
Indonesian Islamic Union Party (PSII) poster (left) on display in the run-up to the 1955 Indonesian legislative election.

With the release of Tjokroaminoto from jail in May 1922, he decided to unify the ideological orientation and get rid of communist infiltration once and for all. In February 1923, SI reformed itself into a political party known as the Islamic Association Party (PSI). Since then, PSI attempted to join forces with other Islamic movements, but they failed to link with the emerging traditionalist Islamic movement of Nahdlatul Ulama and the modernist organization Muhammadiyah, both of which avoided direct political confrontation and focused on community building and education. PSI built a close relationship with the Islamic revival movement Ahmadiyya which was denounced as heresy by Muhammadiyah.

In 1929, PSI renamed itself to the Indonesian Islamic Union Party (PSII) but this did not stop its decline into a secondary political party. In 1930, the party membership was reduced to around 19,000. Tjokroaminoto died in 1934, and the remaining members faced another internal dispute, this time on their political position against the Dutch colonial regime, in light of the heightened surveillance against political dissidents. In 1937, members such as Salim and Mohammad Roem were expelled from the party due to their non-confrontational stance against the Dutch and replaced by the more radical leadership of Abikusno Tjokrosujoso, Tjokroaminoto's brother.

In 1942, the Japanese occupied the Dutch East Indies, and the PSII was banned in March. The PSII was revived in 1947 and was led by Anwar Tjokroaminoto and Harsono Tjokroaminoto, the sons of O.S. Tjokroaminoto. In the 1955 Indonesian legislative election, the PSII performed poorly and won 2.9% of the popular vote. It ceased to exist as an independent entity in 1973 after the forced merger into the United Development Party (PPP) at the hands of the Suharto regime.
