= 1917 Dutch East Indies Volksraad election =

- 16 October 1917
- 22 of the 38 seats in the Volksraad; 20 seats needed for a majority
Party	Seats
Moderate right-wing	12
Moderate left-wing	10
Left-wing	8
Right-wing	8
This lists parties that won seats. See the complete results below.
Composition of the Volksraad following the 1917 election

Elections to the Volksraad were held in the Dutch East Indies on 16 October 1917. The result was a victory for the Dutch Indies Freethinkers Association, who defeated the Protestant Christian Ethical Party and the Catholic Indian Catholic Party.

== Background ==
The Volksraad was created by a law passed on 16 December 1916 in order to further the possibility of self-government. It had a total of 38 members, half of which were to be elected and half appointed. Seats were also assigned to ethnic groups, with 20 for the Dutch population (nine elected, eleven appointed), 15 for the native population (ten elected, five appointed) and three for the Chinese population (all of which were appointed).

== Results ==
Party	Seats
Moderate right-wing	12
Moderate left-wing	10
Left-wing	8
Right-wing	8
Total	38
Source: Schmutzer

=== Volksraad members ===
The subsequent membership of the Volksraad included:

Position	Member	Notes
President	Jacob Christiaan Koningsberger	
Appointed members	Schumann	Independent
Appointed members	Carel Victor Gerritsen	De Javasche Bank
Appointed members	H. s'Jacob	Batavia merchant
Appointed members	Karel Albert Rudolf Bosscha	Manager of tea plantation in Parahyangan
Appointed members	Kettner	Head representative of plantations, Sumatra East Coast
Appointed members	Stibbe	Government resident (official)
Appointed members	Van der Jagt	Assistant resident
Appointed members	Whitlau	Assistant resident
Appointed members	Labberton	Theosophist, Indië Weerbaar propagandist and Home Ruler
Appointed members	A.L. Waworoentoe	Representative of the people of Manado
Appointed members	Atmodirono	Javanese
Appointed members	A. Kamil	Muslim
Appointed members	Sastro Widjono	Javanese
Appointed members	Radjiman Wediodiningrat	Javanese, former leader of Budi Utomo
Appointed members	Achmad Djajadiningrat	Regent of Serang
Appointed members	Koesoemo Oetojo	Regent of Djapara
Appointed members	Koesoemo Joeso	Regent of Patjitan, formerly an official
Appointed members	Abdoel Moeis	Muslim, member of Sarekat Islam
Appointed members	Abdoel Rifai	Muslim, member of the Insulinde party
Elected members	Major Pabst	
Elected members	Josef Ignaz Julius Maria Schmutzer	Roman Catholic, leader of the Indian Catholic Party
Elected members	Bergmeijer	Anti-revolutionary "christian"
Elected members	O. van Voorhout	Head of an iron firm
Elected members	Koning	Head representative of the Koninklijke Paketvaart-Maatschappij
Elected members	Birnie	Administrator of a tobacco estate in Besoeki
Elected members	Stokvis	Inspector of Secondary Education
Elected members	Hok Hoei Kan	Chinese
Elected members	Lim Pat	Chinese. "Major" of Chinese miners in Bangka Island
Elected members	Soeselise	Representative of the Ambonese
Elected members	Frits Laoh	Representative of the Manadoese
Elected members	Charles Guillaume Cramer	Member of the Indies Social Democratic Association
Elected members	J.J.E. Teeuwen	Member of the Insulinde party
Elected members	Tjipto Mangoenkoesoemo	Member of the Insulinde party
Elected members	Prangwedono	Head of Mangkoenegoro
Elected members	Tengkoe Mohammad Tajib	Muslim, representative of Aceh
Elected members	Muhammad Ismail	Muslim, representative of the Arabs
Elected members	Dwidjosewojo	Javanese
Elected members	Oemar Said Tjokroaminoto	Muslim, President of Sarekat Islam
