= Priyayi =

Dutch-era class of nobility in Indonesia

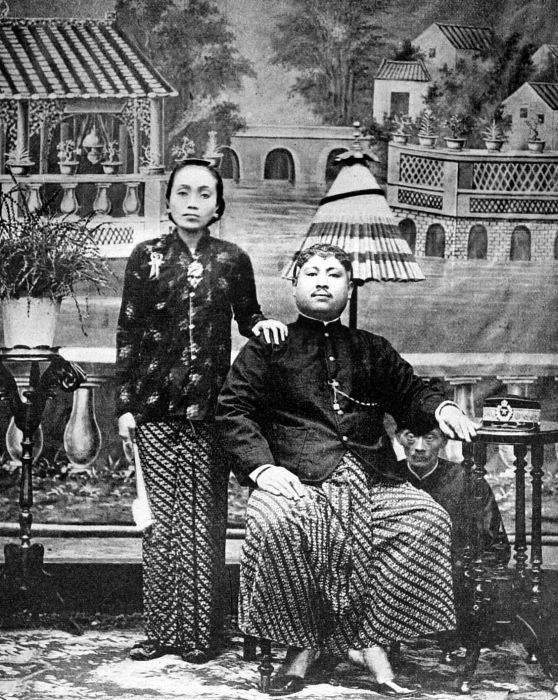
Portrait of Banjoemas, the Regent of Purwokerto, with his wife. A retainer can be seen sitting behind the regent

Priyayi (also spelled Priayi; former spelling: Prijaji) was the Dutch-era class of the nobles of the robe, as opposed to royal nobility or ningrat (Javanese), in Java, Indonesia. Priyayi is a Javanese word originally denoting the descendants of the adipati or governors, the first of whom were appointed in the 17th century by the Sultan Agung of Mataram to administer the principalities he had conquered. Initially court officials in pre-colonial kingdoms, the priyayi moved into the colonial civil service and then on to administrators of the modern Indonesian Republic.

== Pre-colonial period ==
Mataram Sultanate during Sultan Agung's reign, mid-17th century.

The Mataram Sultanate, an Islamic polity in south-central Java that reached its peak in the 17th century, developed a kraton ("court") culture from which the Sultan emerged as a charismatic figure who ruled over a relatively independent aristocracy. Named para yayi ("the king’s brothers"), nobles, officials, administrators, and chiefs were integrated into a patron-client relationship with the Sultan to preside over the peripheries of the kingdom. The homeland of priyayi culture is attributed to Mataram’s center, namely the Javanese-speaking middle and eastern parts of Java. Although "Javanized" by Mataram’s political expansion, the Sundanese-speaking western part of Java, the easternmost parts of Java, and the nearby island of Madura retain ethnic, linguistic, and cultural differences from the Mataramese heartland.

== Colonial period ==
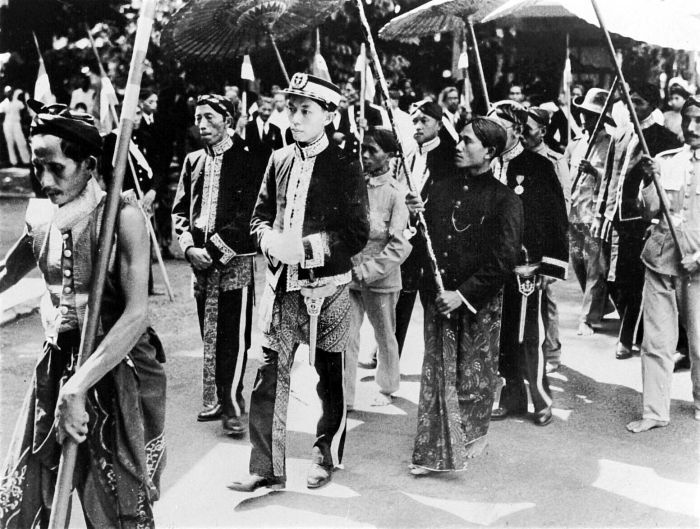
The regent of Surabaya, Raden Tumenggung Musono went in gala dress for his installation, accompanied by lower-ranking officials, patih, and wedana (Dutch colonial period)

After the arrival of the Dutch East India Company (VOC) and the collapse of Mataram, the Sunanate of Surakarta and Sultanate Yogyakarta became centers of Javanese political power since the 1755 Treaty of Giyanti. Although Dutch political influence severely limited their autonomy throughout the colonial period, the two kingdoms continued to serve as symbols of Javanese courtly culture. In the lowland rural areas of Java, the presence of a centralized indigenous bureaucracy strengthened state control over uncultivated land and helped transform the peasantry from independent smallholders to agricultural laborers.

=== Government offices ===
Outside of the areas ruled directly by Yogyakarta and Surakarta, Dutch colonial authorities established two civil service bodies: the Binnenlands Bestuur ("Interior Administration"), staffed by Dutch officials, and the Pangreh Praja ("Ruler of the Realm"), the indigenous bureaucracy.

By 1926, the Binnenlands Bestuur in the directly ruled areas of Java and Madura consisted of the following offices with territorial responsibilities, in descending order:

1. Governor; 3 positions
2. Resident; approximately 20 positions
3. Assistant Resident; approximately 70 positions

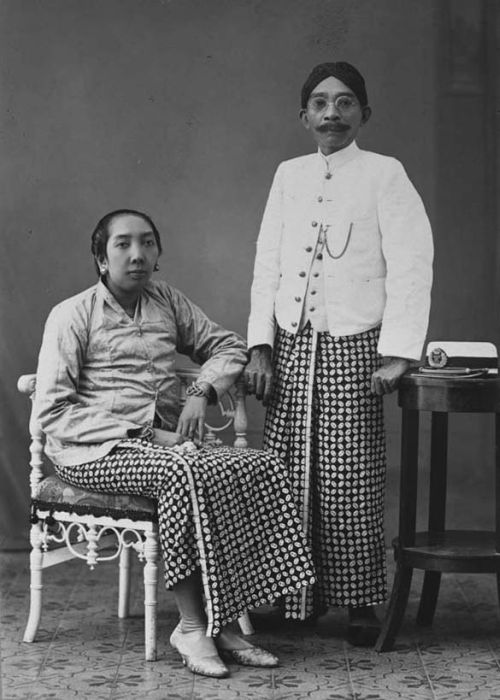
Raden Tumenggung Danoediningrat, Regent of Kediri, with his wife. c. 1920.

In turn, there were three pangreh praja offices with territorial responsibilities, staffed by the indigenous priyayi, in descending order:

1. Bupati ("Regent"); approximately 70 positions. A bupati is responsible for a kabupaten, often a polity with a semi-autonomous history. The position of a bupati was often inherited from father to son, a practice allowed under the 1854 Dutch Constitutions, and families of the bupati often formed a local aristocratic class. The bupati is subordinate to, and usually has a one-to-one correspondence with, the assistant resident ‒ the lowest-ranking official of the Binnenlands Bestuur.
2. Wedana ("District Chief"); approximately 400 positions.
3. Asisten Wedana ("Sub-District Chief"); approximately 1,200 positions.

Other colonial government employees considered to be of priyayi stature included tax officials, prosecutors, and officials attached to police units. By 1931, Europeans accounted only for 10 percent of the entire state apparatus in the Dutch East Indies, and over 250,000 native officials were on the state payroll. In Java, a class distinction existed between priyagung ("upper priyayi"), a group well connected to the aristocratic elite in Surakarta and Yogyakarta, and priyayi cilik ("lower priyayi"). Nonetheless, the social distance separating the priyayi from the peasantry is much greater than that separating the priyagung from the priyayi cilik.

=== Nationalist movements ===
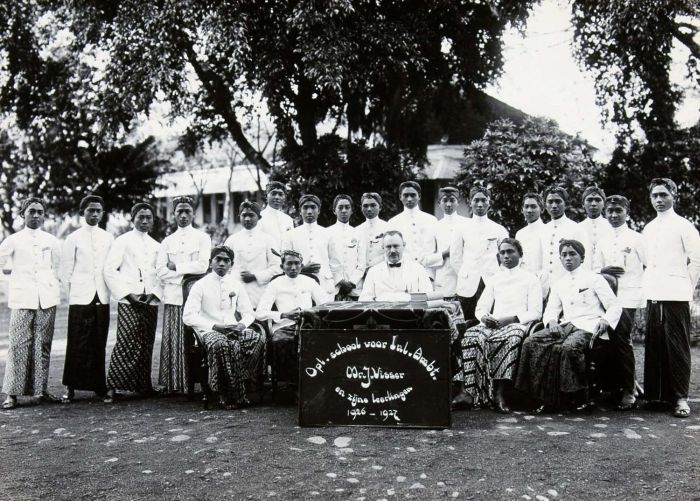
A group portrait of J. Visser and students at the OSVIA, a training school for native government officials in the Dutch East Indies.

In 1901, the Dutch East Indies government established the so-called Ethische Politiek ("Ethical Politics") as an official policy. The Ethical Politics paradigm extended the colonial state control through educational, religious, agricultural, resource extraction, and political surveillance institutions over the native population until the Japanese occupation of 1942. Western-style education became available to the native populace, although only the wealthy could afford tuition at the secondary and tertiary institutions where Dutch was the primary language of instruction. Among the Javanese, priyayi men were the first to be educated at Western-style institutions before entering the colonial civil service.

Nationalistic sentiments among Javanese elites who received Dutch education were formative in the era of the Indonesian National Awakening. The Boedi Oetomo, the first indigenous political society in the Dutch East Indies, was established by a group of priyayi doctors and medical students in 1908. Although the group was confined to a Javanese, male priyayi following, the Boedi Oetomo was the first in a series of indigenous political activism in the Dutch East Indies. The Boedi Oetomo gave rise to prominent priyayi figures such as Soetatmo Soeriekosomo (1888-1924) and Noto Soeroto (1888-1951), who are advocates for ethnic nationalism through the Committee for Javanese Nationalism, as well as advocates of Indies-wide nationalism, such as Tjipto Mangoenkoesoemo (1886-1943) who later founded the Indische Party. The emergence of other ethnic nationalist groups and Indies-nationalist political parties in Java later eclipsed Javanese nationalism and gave rise to the emergence of a broader, Indonesian-language nationalism throughout the 1920s and 30s.

== Post-independence period ==
The recognition of the Republic of Indonesia in 1949 by Dutch authorities resulted in the integration of bureaucratic institutions from Dutch-controlled federal states into the new Republic. The number of civil servants in Indonesia thus grew from 115,000 in the late 1920s to 400,000 in the early 1950s. However, the strategic top echelons were dominated by an elite group of 100,000 Dutch-trained senior officials, which were concentrated in the Ministry of Home Affairs. By the 1980s, Indonesia’s civil service expanded to approximately 2 million members, which amounted to 13.9 civil servants per 1,000 of the population, in contrast to the much lower 3.7 per 1,000 in 1950.

Although the status of a priyayi does not have a formal presence in post-independence Indonesian law, proximity to the executive branches of the state, which it symbolizes, remained a popular mode of upward socio-political mobility from the 1950s and after. The New Order government of Suharto encouraged traditional priyayi and corporatist values in the Indonesian civil service, especially through the establishment of the Indonesian Civil Servants' Corps (KORPRI) in 1971.

== Titles ==
The priyayi class used an elaborate title system. Some of the commonly used titles among Javanese nobility were:

- Raden Mas: used by male nobility
- Raden Ayu: used by married female nobility
- Raden Ajeng: used by unmarried female nobility
- Tumenggung: additional title, used by nobility who held a Regency office
- Raden: a title used by male nobility lower than Raden Mas
- Raden Nganten: a title used by married female nobility lower than Raden Ayu
- Raden Rara (read as Raden Roro): a title used by unmarried female nobility lower than Raden Ajeng
- Mas: a title for male petty nobility

The order of precedence for male nobility titles is: a simple Mas is the lowest, followed by simple Raden, and then the higher titles are compound titles of Raden Mas, Raden Panji, Raden Tumenggung, Raden Ngabehi, and Raden Aria. These titles were hereditary to some extent; a son would inherit a title one level lower than his parent unless it was already of the lowest rank.

The honorific Raden is related to the Malagasy noble titles of Randriana or Andriana, both of which are derived from the word "Rahadyan" (Ra-hadi-an), meaning "Lord" or "Master" in Old Javanese.

== Cultural attributes ==
American cultural anthropologist Clifford Geertz explained two cultural oppositions in priyayi worldview that characterizes the priyayi as a social status: alus ("refined") against kasar ("unrefined"), and batin ("inner human experience") against lahir ("outer human behavior"). As a feudalistic subculture in Javanese society distinct from the peasantry, priyayi culture emphasizes the alus over the kasar, and the batin over the lahir.

=== Religion ===
The principal religion of the ethnic Javanese populace in the provinces of Central Java, East Java, and the Special Region of Yogyakarta is Islam, although there are minorities of Roman Catholic Christians, Protestant Christians, Hindus, Buddhists and Confucianists, as well as practitioners of traditional religions (the Aliran Kepercayaan). Within Javanese Islam, Geertz identified three alirans, or cultural streams: the abangan, the santri, and the priyayi. Members of the santri stream are more likely to be urban dwellers and tend to be oriented to the mosque, the Qur'an, and Islamic canon law. In contrast, the abangan tend to be from village peasant backgrounds and absorb both Hindu and Muslim elements, forming a culture of animist and folk traditions. The priyayi stream is the traditional bureaucratic elite and was strongly driven by hierarchical Hindu-Javanese tradition. The santri are sometimes referred to as Putihan ("the white ones") as distinct from the 'red' abangan. In general, the religion of the priyayi is closer to the abangan tradition than the santri, because it combines Indic polytheism and Islamic monotheism. Public rituals, such as slametan, or the communal feast, are practiced in abangan peasant and priyayi households alike. However, priyayi families in the central and eastern parts of the northern coast of the island were probably traditionally closer to the santri in their religious practices than their hinterland counterparts and emphasized genealogical ties to the wali sanga, the nine Islamic saints of Java.

=== Socio-economic status ===
While the abangan are often peasants, the priyayi is the class of the landed gentry of towns and urban population centers. Unlike feudal landlords, however, the priyayi of the Dutch colonial period are white-collar government employees who work as bureaucrats, teachers, and clerks. The priyayi distinguish themselves from the peasantry and the merchant class by defining their work for the government as alus ("refined"), as opposed to trading, farming, and laboring, which are defined as kasar ("unrefined"). An early 19th-century poem, "Suluk Mas Nganten," written by Jayadiningrat I, a Surakarta courtier, describes priyayi as a charismatic power, and not just socio-economic stature, that merchants cannot achieve:

Ana maneh nisthane wong memantu
ana ta sudagar cilik
awatara sugihipun
kepengin cara priyayi

Again there is the shame of one who held a wedding
There was a petty merchant
Middling was his wealth
He yearned to follow the style of the priyayi

Priyayi families, however, also engage in trading through informal channels. Until the 1980s, priyayi women often supplemented their household income by selling homemade textiles and craftswear, although trading in public places is seen as inappropriate for upper- and middle-class priyayi women.

=== Language ===
Literacy and command of multiple Javanese language registers were sources of priyayi prestige during the Dutch colonial era when the majority of Java’s population was illiterate. The two major levels of discourse in the Javanese language are krama ("formal") and ngoko ("informal"). Mastery of krama, a set of registers primarily spoken up the social hierarchy, requires high levels of education. Towards the end of the 19th century, when younger cadres of priyayi received Dutch-language education, the Javanese "inner elite" began adopting Dutch not only as a language used at work when interacting with the Dutch but also at home and among Javanese circles. The colonial era priyayi, therefore, became a largely bilingual class. Since independence, Indonesian has been adopted as a national language, and new styles of Indonesian and Javanese have emerged as a continuation of the krama and ngoko registers in official publications and popular literature.

=== Arts ===
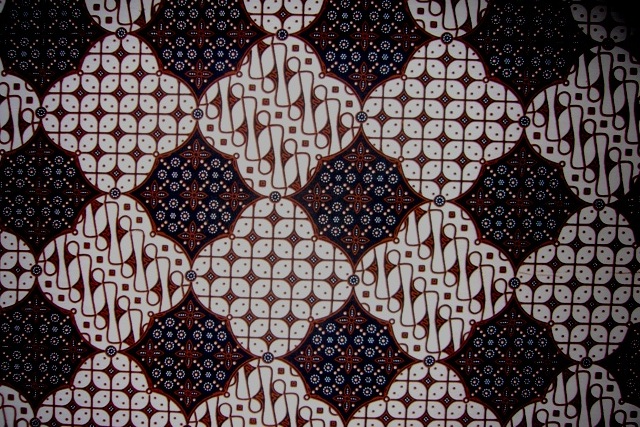
A batik pattern from Yogyakarta

The priyayi are patrons and practitioners of classical, courtly Javanese art forms, which they regard as alus and refined in contrast to the peasant art forms:

1. wayang; the shadow-play that performs Javanese retellings of the Ramayana, the Mahabharata, and the history of pre-colonial Javanese kingdoms
2. gamelan; the percussion orchestra that accompanies wayang performances or performs independently
3. lakon; dramatizations of wayang stories and myths that are retold orally
4. tembang; rigid forms of poetry that is recited or sung with gamelan accompaniment
5. batik; textile-making with wax and dye

== See also ==
- Hinduism in Java
- Indonesian Esoteric Buddhism
- Javanese Kshatriya
- Javanisation
- Kejawen
- Slametan
- Djajadiningrat family
- Han family of Lasem

== Notes ==
=== References ===
- Adelaar, Alexander (2006). "The Indonesian migrations to Madagascar: Making sense of the multidisciplinary evidence" (PDF). In Alexander Adelaar (ed.). Austronesian diaspora and the ethnogenesis of people in Indonesian Archipelago. Lipi Press.
- Anderson, Benedict (1990). Language and Power: Exploring Political Cultures in Indonesia. Ithaca: Cornell University Press.
- Anderson, Benedict; Soejatno (1974). "Revolution and Social Tensions in Surakarta 1945-1950". Indonesia. 17 (17): 99–111. doi:10.2307/3350775. hdl:1813/53581. JSTOR 3350775.
- Atmosumarto, Sutanto (2004). A learner's comprehensive dictionary of Indonesian. Atma Stanton. ISBN 9780954682804.
- Brenner, Suzanne A. (1991). "Competing Hierarchies: Merchants and the Priyayi Elite in Solo, Central Java". Indonesia. 52 (52): 55–83. doi:10.2307/3351155. hdl:1813/53965. JSTOR 3351155.
- Carey, Peter (1997). "Civilization on Loan: The Making of an Upstart Polity: Mataram and Its Successors, 1600-1830". Modern Asian Studies. 31 (3): 711–734. doi:10.1017/s0026749x00017121.
- Cribb, Robert; Kahin, Audrey (2004). Historical Dictionary of Southeast Asia. Lanham, MD: Scarecrow Press.
- Evers, Hans-Dieter (1997). "The Bureaucratization of Southeast Asia". Comparative Studies in Society and History. 29 (4): 666–685. doi:10.1017/S0010417500014833.
- Fakih, Farabi (2012). "Conservative Corporatist: Nationalist Thoughts of Aristocrats: The ideas of Soetatmo Soeriokoesoemo and Noto Soeroto". Bijdragen tot de Taal-, Land- en Volkenkunde. 168 (4): 420–444. doi:10.1163/22134379-90003551.
- Geertz, Clifford (1960). The Religion of Java. Glencoe, IL: Free Press.
- Hagen, James (1997). "'Read All about It': The Press and the Rise of National Consciousness in Early Twentieth-Century Dutch East Indies Society". Anthropological Quarterly. 70 (3): 107–126. doi:10.2307/3317671. JSTOR 3317671.
- Ibrahim, Ahmad; Siddique, Sharon; Hussain, Yasmin (1985). Readings on Islam in Southeast Asia. Institute of Southeast Asian Studies. ISBN 9789971988081.
- McDonald, Hamish (1980). Suharto's Indonesia. Melbourne: Fontana.
- Nordholt, Henk Schulte (2011). "Indonesia in the 1950s: Nation, Modernity, and the Post-Colonial State". Bijdragen tot de Taal-, Land- en Volkenkunde. 167 (4): 386–404. doi:10.1163/22134379-90003577. hdl:20.500.11755/2fd66373-1f4e-4a35-b415-831be5e36afa.
- Schiel (1975), p. 79
- Schiel, Tilman (1990). "'Petani' and 'Priyayi': The Transformation of Java and the Rise of Despotism". Sojourn: Journal of Social Issues in Southeast Asia. 5 (1): 63–85. doi:10.1355/sj5-1c (inactive 1 July 2025).
- Schijf, Huibert; The, Bernardine Anne-Mei (1992). "Chinese Doctors in the Dutch East Indies: Social Mobility among an Ethnic Trading Minority". Indonesia. 53 (53): 33–50. doi:10.2307/3351113. hdl:1813/53976. JSTOR 3351113.
- Shiraishi, Takashi (1981). "The Disputes between Tjipto Mangoenkoesoemo and Soetatmo Soeriokoesoemo: Satria vs. Pandita". Indonesia. 32 (32): 93–108. doi:10.2307/3350857. hdl:1813/53733. JSTOR 3350857.
- Suryadinata, Leo (1978). "Indonesian Nationalism and the Pre-War Youth Movement: A Reexamination". Journal of Southeast Asian Studies. 9 (1): 99–114. doi:10.1017/S0022463400009553.
- Sutherland, Heather (1973). "Notes on Java's Regent Families Part 1". Indonesia. 16 (16): 112–147. doi:10.2307/3350649. hdl:1813/53565. JSTOR 3350649.
- Sutherland, Heather (1975). "The Priyayi". Indonesia. 19 (19): 57–77. doi:10.2307/3350702. hdl:1813/53598. JSTOR 3350702.
