= Ki Hajar Dewantara =

Indonesia's education hero

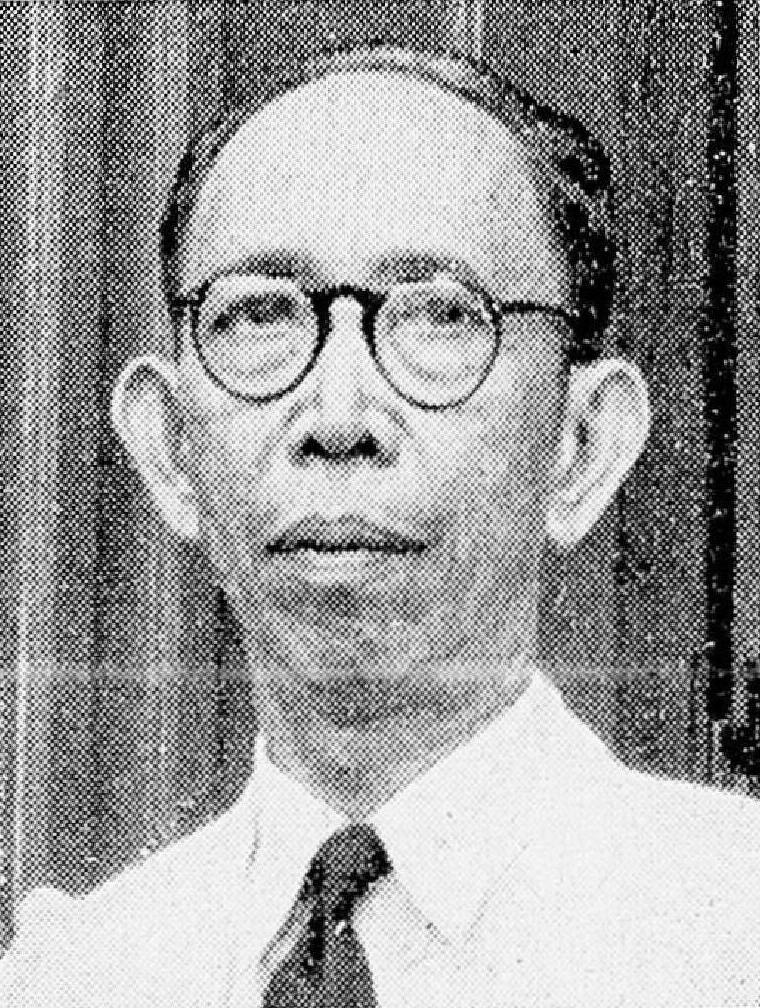
- Portrait, c. 1942–1943

1st Minister of National Education of the Republic of Indonesia
- In office 2 September 1945 – 14 November 1945
- President: Sukarno
- Preceded by: Office created
- Succeeded by: Todung Sutan Gunung Mulia

Personal details
- Born: Raden Mas Soewardi Soeryaningrat; 2 May 1889 Pakualaman, Dutch East Indies
- Died: 26 April 1959 (aged 69) Yogyakarta, Indonesia
- Spouse: Raden Ajeng Sutartinah
- Children: Asti Wandansari; Sudiro Alimurtolo; Syailendra Wijaya; Bambang Sokawati Dewantara; Ratih Tarbiyah
- Parent: Kanjeng Pangeran Harya Suryaningrat (father)

Raden Mas Soewardi Soerjaningrat (Note: Spelling under the old Van Ophuijsen Spelling System which was used during the Dutch colonial period. Under modern Indonesian orthography, his name would be spelled as Suwardi Suryaningrat.) (2 May 1889 – 26 April 1959), better known by the name Ki Hajar Dewantara (Note: Spelling under modern Indonesian orthography. Under the Republican Spelling System used from 1947 to 1972, his middle name was spelled as Hadjar. Sometimes his last name is written as Dewantoro to reflect its Javanese pronunciation.) since 1922, was a leading Indonesian independence movement activist, writer, columnist, politician, and pioneer of education for native Indonesians in Dutch colonial times. He founded the Taman Siswa school, an institution that provided education for indigenous commoners, which otherwise was limited to the Javanese aristocracy and the Dutch colonials.

He was honored as a National Hero of Indonesia by Indonesia's first president, Sukarno, on 28 November 1959.

== Early life ==
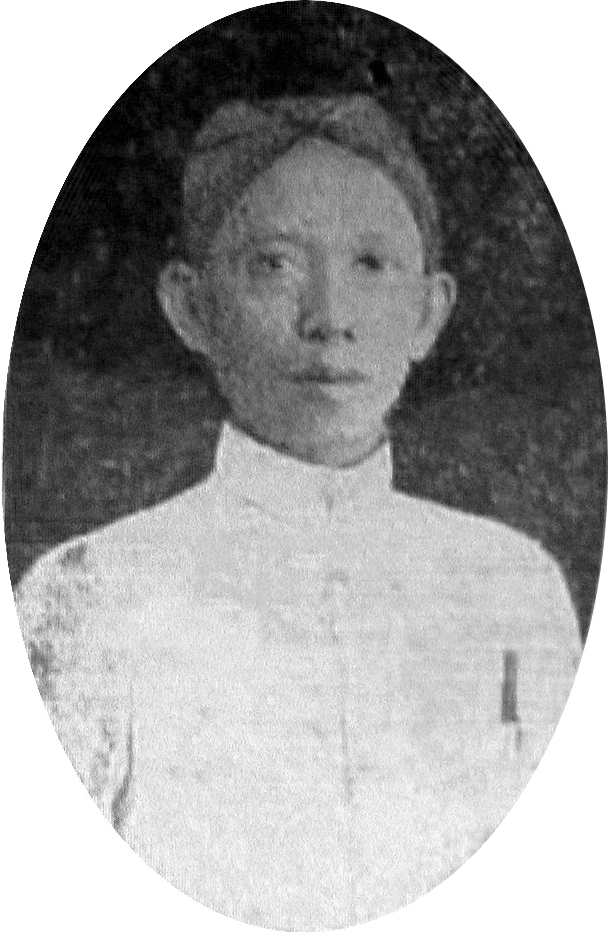
Dewantara in his youth

Soewardi was born into Javanese aristocracy, his family belonged to the royal house of Pakualaman. He was one of Prince Paku Alam III's grandsons through his father, GPH Soerjaningrat. Thanks to his family's priyayi (Javanese nobility) background, he was able to access colonial public education, a luxury that was unattainable by most of the common population in the Indies. He graduated with a basic education in ELS (Dutch Primary School). Then he continued his study at STOVIA, a medical school for native students. However, he failed to graduate because of illness.

Later he worked as a journalist and wrote for many newspapers, including Sediotomo, Midden Java, De Expres, Oetoesan Indies, Kaoem Moeda, Tjahaja Timoer, and Poesara. He was also a contributor to Kebangoenan, a nationalist newspaper owned by the Dutch-educated jurist and politician Phoa Liong Gie. During Soewardi's career in printed media, he was considered a talented and accomplished writer. His style of writing is popular, communicative, and yet imbued with idealism for freedom and anti-colonialist sentiment.

== Activist movements ==
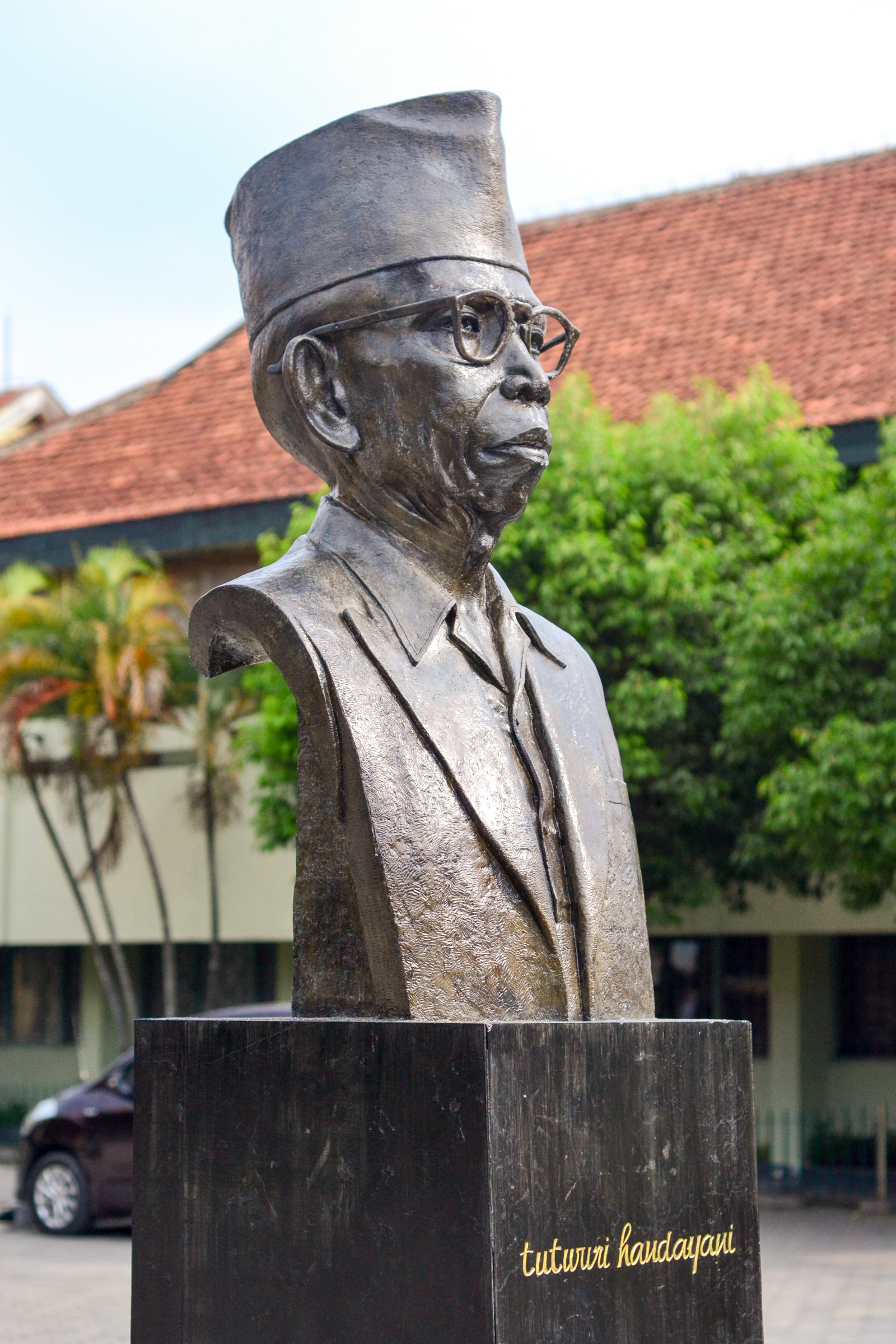
Statue of Ki Hadjar Dewantara in front of Sekolah Tamansiswa

Besides being a tenacious young reporter, Soewardi was also active in social and political organizations. Since the establishment of Boedi Oetomo in 1908, he has been active in their propaganda service to socialize and promote public awareness of Indonesia as a national unity (especially in Java). He also organized Boedi Oetomo's first congress in Yogyakarta.

Young Soewardi was also a member of the Insulinde, a multi-ethnic organization that was dominated by Indo activists. This organization was advocating for self-rule in the Dutch East Indies. One of the prominent figures in this organization was Ernest Douwes Dekker. Later, Soewardi was invited to join the party when Douwes Dekker established the Indische Party.

== If I were a Dutchman ==
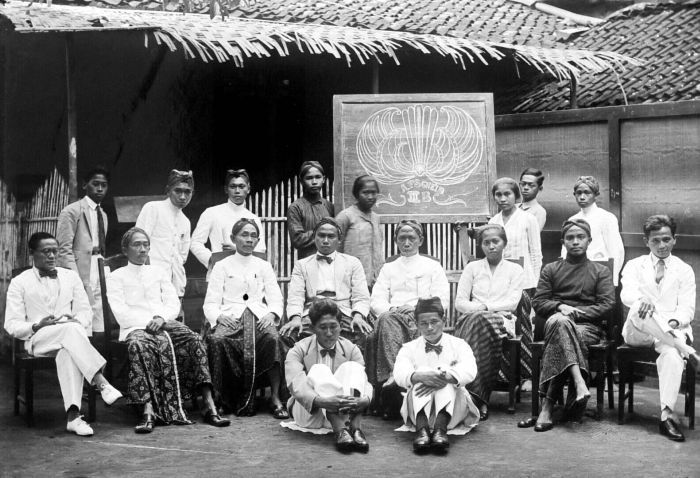
Teachers at the Taman Siswa school in Jogjakarta.

In 1913, the Dutch East Indies government sought to collect money to fund the centennial anniversary of Dutch independence from France in 1813. The donations were drawn from Dutch East Indies citizens, which also included the bumiputera (indigenous people). This decision ignited critical opposition and negative reactions from pro-independence nationalists, including Soewardi. He wrote several critical columns, such as "Een maar ook voor Allen Allen voor Een" or "One for All, All for One". However, the most famous piece of Ki Hadjar Dewantara's column is "If I were a Dutchman" ("Als ik eens Nederlander was"), printed in De Expres newspaper on 13 July 1913. This article fiercely criticized the colonial government of the Dutch East Indies. The citation of his writing is as followsː

If I were a Dutchman, I would not celebrate an independence ceremony in the country where we ourselves, are denied their rights of freedom. Consistent with the way of the mind, it was not only unfair, but also inappropriate to ask the Inlander (native Indonesian) to provide funds for such festivities. The very idea of the independence festivities alone is quite insulting for them, and now we also scour their pockets. Come on, away with the physical and spiritual humiliation! Had I been a Dutchman, a particular case that offends our friends and countrymen, is the fact that the inlanders required to participate and bankrolled an activity that do not have the slightest importance for them.

Some Dutch officials doubted that this piece was written by Soewardi because compared to his earlier writings, there are some differences in style and vocabulary. Even if it is true, that it was Soewardi's writing, they suspected that Douwes Dekker might have actively influenced Soewardi to write in such a tone.

The colonial authorities considered Soewardi's writings that criticize the colonial government to be so subversive, sensitive, and divisive that they feared they might incite a popular revolt and upset the delicate social order of the Dutch East Indies. As a consequence, Soewardi was arrested under the order of Governor General Alexander Idenburg, and sentenced to exile in Bangka Island. However, both his colleagues, Douwes Dekker and Tjipto Mangoenkoesoemo, protested on his behalf, and eventually in 1913, the three of them were exiled to the Netherlands instead. These three pro-independence activist figures, Soewardi, Douwes Dekker, and Tjipto, were later known as the Tiga Serangkai or the "triad". Soewardi at that time was only 24 years old.

== Exile ==
During his exile in the Netherlands, Soewardi was active in the Indonesia students' organization, the Indische Vereeniging (Indies Association), where he contemplated the idea of advancing science education for natives, by obtaining the European certificate, an education diploma which later became the foundation for the educational institutions he would found. In this study, Soewardi was fascinated by the ideas of Western education figures, such as Fröbel and Montessori, as well as Indian education movement activist Santiniketan and the Tagore family. These underlying influences contributed to Soewardi's ideas for developing his educational system.

== Taman Siswa ==
In September 1919, Soewardi returned home to Java, Dutch East Indies. Immediately, he joined his brother in establishing a school in his native hometown Yogyakarta. His educational background and his teaching experiences then proved to be useful in developing his concept for teaching in school, as he founded the Nationaal Onderwijs Instituut Ampel, or the national college. During the time of colonial social discrimination in the early 20th century, education was only made possible for the elites, the colonial Dutch people, and a handful of Javanese noblemen families. Education at that time was not made available for native commoners. In July 1922, Soewardi established the Taman Siswa school in Yogyakarta, a Javanese educational movement that strove to provide education for the native population.

When he reached 40 years of age, according to the Javanese beliefs based upon the Javanese calendar, he was required to change his name to ward off misfortunes that might befall him. Thus he chooses "Ki Hadjar Dewantara" as his new name. He also scrapped the Javanese gentility title Raden Mas in front of his name. It was a gesture to demonstrate his support for social equality and his disregard for the rigid social stature of Javanese society. Ki Hadjar intended to freely interact with people of all social backgrounds and to be close to them in both body and soul.

== Tut Wuri Handayani ==
Ki Hadjar Dewantara has coined a famous proverb to describe his educational ideals. Rendered in Javanese, the maxim reads: Ing ngarsa sung tuladha, ing madya mangun karsa, tut wuri handayani. Which translates: "(for those) in front should set an example, (for those) in the middle should raise the spirit, and (for those) behind should give encouragement". The proverb is used as the principle of Taman Siswa. Today, part of this maxim, Tut Wuri Handayani is used as the motto of the Indonesian Ministry of Education, Culture, Research and Technology. It was meant to describe ideal teachers, who after transmitting knowledge to their students, would stand behind their students and encourage them in their quest for knowledge.

== Government offices ==
During the Japanese occupation, Ki Hajar's activities in the field of politics and education continued. When the Japanese government established the People Power Center (Pusat Tenaga Rakyat or Putera) in 1943, Ki Hajar was appointed as one of its leaders, in addition to Sukarno, Muhammad Hatta, and K.H. Mas Mansur. That same year, on 4 October, he was appointed to the Javanese Central Advisory Council, which also set up the occupation government.

In the first cabinet of the Republic of Indonesia in the 1950s, Ki Hajar Dewantara was appointed Indonesian Minister of Education and Culture. In 1957 he received an honorary doctorate honoris causa from Indonesia's oldest university, Gadjah Mada University.

He died in Yogyakarta on 26 April 1959 and was buried in Taman Wijaya Brata cemetery.

== Recognition and honours ==
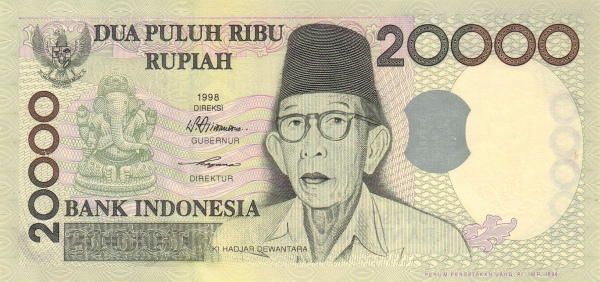
Ki Hajar Dewantara featured on the 20,000-rupiah banknote.

In recognition of his dedication and accomplishments in pioneering public education in Indonesia, he was declared the Father of Indonesian National Education, a national hero, and his birthday is appointed as National Education Day, through Presidential Decree no. 305 of 1959, dated 28 November 1959.

Taman Siswa has established Dewantara Kirti Griya Museum in Yogyakarta. The museum was built to commemorate, preserve, and promote the thoughts, values, and ideals of Ki Hajar Dewantara, the founder of Taman Siswa. In this museum, there are objects and works of Ki Hajar Dewantara. Museum collections include his works, papers, concepts, important documents, and correspondence of Ki Hajar during his lifetime as a journalist, educator, humanist, and artist. These documents have been recorded on microfilms and some are laminated with the help of the National Archives of Indonesia.

== Legacy ==
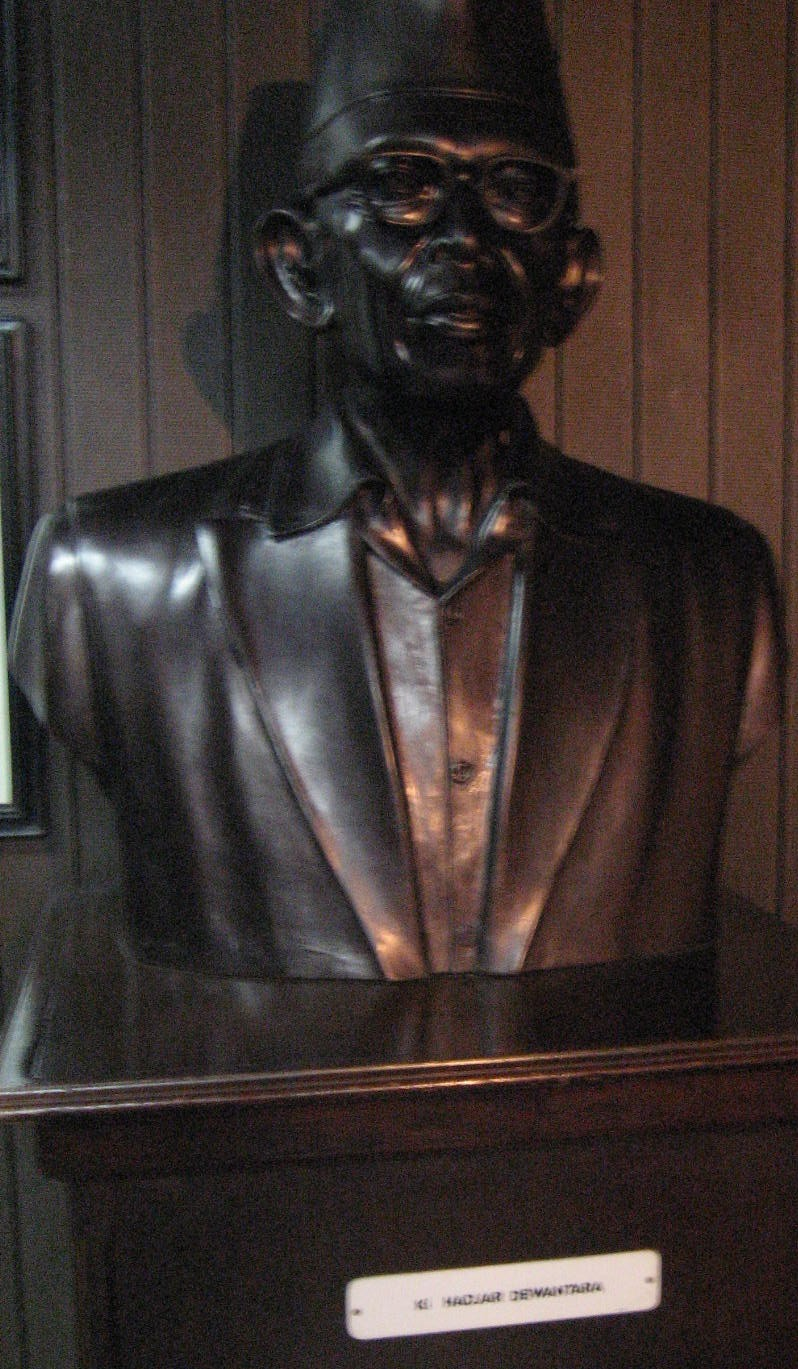
Statue of Ki Hajar Dewantara, Indonesian pioneer of education

Ki Hajar Dewantara advocates that education should be made possible and available for all people, regardless of their sex, race, ethnicity, culture, religion, economic and social status, etc. He argued that education should be based on the values of common humanity, human freedom, and the right to seek knowledge.

Ki Hajar Dewantara's birthday is now celebrated as Indonesian National Education Day. He is also credited for having coined the motto; Tut Wuri Handayani, today used by the Ministry of Education. An Indonesian navy training ship, KRI Ki Hajar Dewantara, bears his name in honor. His portrait immortalizes him in the 20,000 rupiah banknote denomination in 1998.

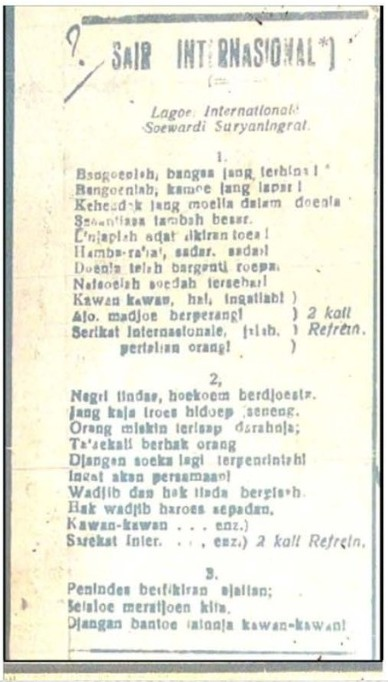
Ki Hajar Dewantara's Internationale

Ki Hajar Dewantara was also instrumental in the translation of the Internationale to Indonesian, becoming a symbol of the labour movement in Indonesia.

== Tribute ==
On 2 May 2015, Google celebrated Ki Hajar Dewantara's 126th birthday with a Google Doodle.

== Notes ==
Political offices
New title	Minister of Education; 1945	Succeeded by Todung Sutan Gunung Mulia
