= P. F. Dahler =

Indo politician and activist

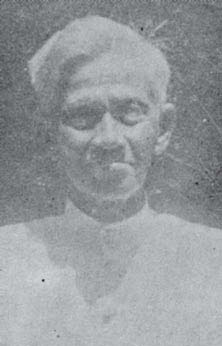
- Dahler in the 1940s
- Born: Pieter Frederich Dahler; 21 February 1883; Semarang, Dutch East Indies
- Died: 7 June 1948; Jogjakarta, Dutch East Indies
- Occupations: Activist, teacher, Politician

Pieter Frederich "Frits" Dahler (21 February 1883 – 7 June 1948) was an Indo politician and activist advocating integration of the native Indo-European community into the indigenous society of the Dutch East Indies and post-colonial Indonesia. After World War II he changed his name to Amir Dachlan.

Together with E.F.E. Douwes Dekker, he was a strong political proponent of association between Indo-Europeans and Indonesians in the colonial Dutch East Indies and early post-colonial Indonesia.

== Historical context ==
See also Indos in pre-colonial history

From pre-colonial times (16th, 17th and 18th centuries) up to the first century of formal colonisation of the Dutch East Indies (19th century) the Eurasian hybrid culture of Indo-Europeans was very closely related to the indigenous cultures of the Indies archipelago. Although Indos were part of the European legal class its lingua franca and much of its practices and beliefs were derived from its indigenous maternal lineage.

See also Indos in colonial history

In the 20th century the assault on Indo culture in the Dutch East Indies to Westernise accelerated, rapidly enforcing a one-sided identification with Dutch culture rigorously imposed by the ruling colonial authorities. From their historic role as indispensable intermediaries and change agents, the Indos were increasingly reduced to a marginal position in colonial society.

Simultaneously the Dutch Ethical Policy created an educated indigenous elite increasingly voicing the idea of Indonesian national independence. For the relatively small Indo-European community (less than 0.5% of the total native population) this posed the challenge of positioning itself between the emerging forces of the Indonesian National Awakening and the repressive forces of the colonial power.

Throughout the Japanese occupation of the Dutch East Indies in World War II and the following Indonesian revolution the existing estrangement between the native Indo-European population and indigenous peoples only widened and intensified.

In the first half of the 20th century during both the Dutch and Japanese colonial period as well as the Indonesian revolution Dahler was one of the leading Indo-European figures voicing the idea of so-called 'Association' i.e. integration of the Indo-Europeans into the indigenous population.

== Early life ==
Dahler was born on 21 February 1883 in Semarang. He spoke several indigenous languages and had risen to the rank of 'Controleur' in the colonial civil service in the Dutch East Indies. In 1918 he befriended famous politician and activist E.F.E. Douwes Dekker and became a leader of the new National Indische Party. 1922 he became that party's delegate in the People's Assembly (Dutch: Volksraad). In 1938 he was an editor of the Malay language weekly 'Penindjauan'. Here he befriended the indigenous intellectuals Amir and Sam Ratulangi. At the same time he was editor in chief of the Malay language paper 'Bintang Timoer' (English: Eastern Star). He was also a teacher in amongst others Douwes Dekker's ‘Ksatrian’ schools as well as the ‘Pergoeroean Rakjat’ schools.

== World War II ==
During the Japanese occupation in World War II the Japanese found it hard to determine their position regarding the Eurasian population of the Dutch East Indies. Hesitant to imprison the relatively large number of Indos and in need of an administrative backbone to support their occupation of the outstretched and populous archipelago their initial stance towards the Indos was one of relative leniency.

The Japanese clearly chose to focus on their Asian descent, rather than their European descent and continued to groom the Indos through much of the occupation. Their attempts had little to no avail as Indos continued to cling to their western heritage. In contrast the Eurasian community in neighbouring Malaya, that was hectored and admonished in the same way as the Indos in the 'Japanese East Indies', but that did not constitute any serious problem for the Japanese occupier.

During this whole period Dahler remained consistent in his beliefs of association and continued to call for integration of Indos into indigenous Indonesian society. Dahler himself in fact preferred the term ‘Eurasian’ iso the more common term ‘Indo-European’ wanting to emphasise the Asian element of Indos. He became the leader of the pro-Indonesian Indo movement and throughout the occupation attempted to elucidate the Japanese and Indonesian viewpoints.

In August 1943 Dahler became head of the so-called 'Kantor Oeroesan Peranakan' (KOP), 'Office for Indo Matters' also more commonly known as the 'Dahler Office'. 'Belanda-Indo' (Dutch-Indo) the earlier Malay term used by the Japanese for Indos was now changed to 'Peranakan' (Descendant). In September 1943 Indos were officially labelled 'non-hostile', and the Japanese promised to release Indos from their civilian prison camps. Additionally, Indos were allowed to cash in 30% of their bank savings and send their children to school again. During another round of Japanese registration in October 1943, Indos had to provide proof demonstrating at least 7 Indo or indigenous ancestors.

Still many Indonesians believed that the deeply rooted differences between themselves and the Indos could not be eradicated overnight, simultaneously the reactionary response of many Indos was to straight out reject the idea of being equated with Indonesians. Sentiments in the Indo community were hurled to and fro between pro- or anti Dutch and pro- or anti Indonesian and Japanese feelings. Overall the majority of Indos remained fiercely proud of their European roots and opposed both Japanese and Indonesian attempts to denounce their western identity.

Towards the end of WWII repressive measures towards Indos became more aggressive. The number of Indos imprisoned by the Japanese, in fact, continued to increase during the course of the occupation accumulating to 35% of the total Indo community. In 1944 a more radical group of pro-Indonesian Indos under leadership of Van den Eeckhout were added to the Dahler office. The older Dahler, who was known to be a quiet and amiable man, did not take a liking to the militant and sometimes harsh approach of the newcomers, but was unable to temper it, as Van den Eeckhout was being directly instructed by the Japanese. October 1944 in a youth camp set up for Indo boys south of Dampit 13 boys (age 16 to 21) were accused of subversive behaviour and publicly beheaded by the Japanese.

== After the war ==
Dahler was the only Indo who participated in the Investigating Committee for Preparatory Work for Independence (BPUPK) and established by the Japanese in May 1945. After Indonesia's declaration of independence Dahler was a member of the political section of the Indonesian National Party (PNI). Together with independence leaders Sukarno and Sjahrir he continued to groom Indos to join the national revolution, but their efforts were undone by extremist revolutionary forces during the violent Bersiap period.

February 1946 Dahler was arrested in Batavia by the Dutch and accused of collaboration with Japan. Although the Dutch considered him morally culpable, no actual criminal grounds for conviction were found and he was eventually granted amnesty. In May 1947 Dahler moved to Republican territory and was reunited with his old friend Douwes Dekker, who had secretly returned from exile. Dahler died on 7 June 1948 in Jogjakarta without witnessing the official transfer of Dutch authority to the Indonesian Republic.

After Indonesian independence in 1949 the young nation continued to face economic downturn and contra-revolutionary turmoil threatening its national unity. Sukarno's reactionary policy of anti-Dutch confrontation indirectly stimulated anti-Indo sentiments leading to the Indo diaspora. Ironically in an effort to reduce repatriation of Indos to the Netherlands the Dutch government now actively promoted Indonesian citizenship for Indo-Europeans, the very idea Dahler had always fought for.

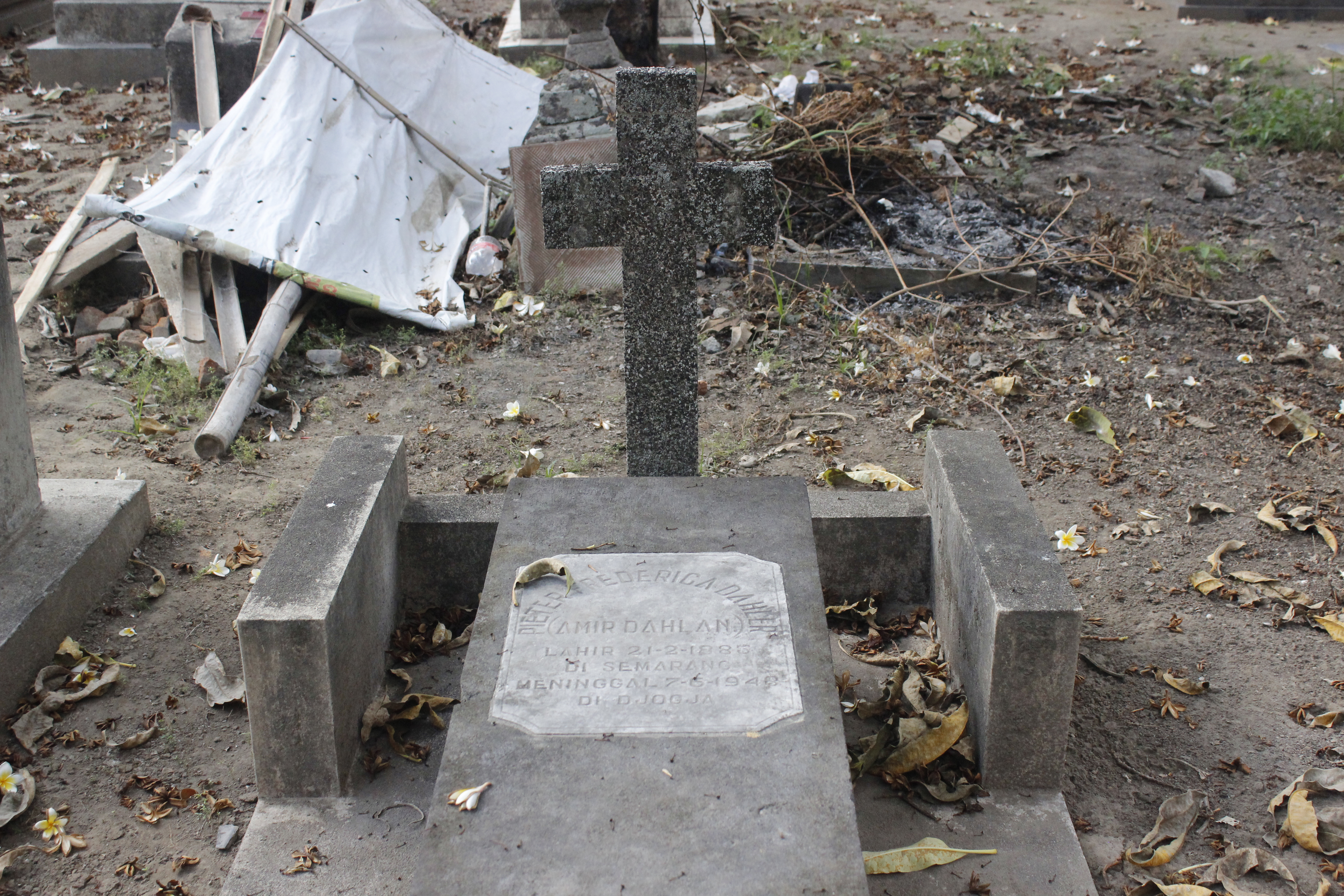
Dahler's grave in Bethesda Hospital Cemetery, Mrican, Yogyakarta.

Dahler's tireless efforts to persuade Indo-Europeans to associate themselves with the indigenous peoples were often misconstrued as acts of betrayal, causing much resentment among his fellow Indo compatriots. Over the years his stance has been largely vindicated by advancing historic insights and more objective reflective analysis.

== Personal life ==
=== Family ===
Married to Eleonora Helena Emilie Maijer (3 November 1884 – 5 March 1916), daughter of Wilhelm Friedrich Maijer and Wilhelmina Adriana Noordhoorn. They had at least one son named Rudolf Antoine Dahler (16 July 1914 – 3 June 1992). After the death of his first wife, he married his second wife Pauline Françoise Wattiez and had at least one daughter, Sophie Faubel-Dahler, married to Frederik Faubel, and a son named L.A. (Loet) Dahler.

Note: L.A. Dahler was a son from his first marriage ( 2 Nov 1910 - .. April 1998 )

=== Religious life ===
After Indonesian independence, Dahler converted from Christianity to Islam and changed his name to Amir Dahlan. However, despite his conversion, he personally requested to be buried in a Christian cemetery in Mrican (an area in Yogyakarta). Max Rooyackers, a student from Sanata Dharma University, stated that Dahler's conversion was a symbolic one and meant as an expression of assimilation and support for Indonesian nationalism. He concluded that until his death, Dahler remained a Christian.

=== References ===
- Meijer, Hans In Indië geworteld. De 20ste eeuw. (Publisher: Bert Bakker, Amsterdam, 2004) P.67, 180, 217–218, 220, 222, 225, 227–228, 232–235, 242, 265, 380 ISBN 90-351-2617-3
- Touwen-Bouwsma, E. “Japanese minority policy; The Eurasians on Java and the dilemma of ethnic loyalty.” in Bijdragen tot de Taal-, Land- en Volkenkunde 152, no.4. ‘Japan, Indonesia and the WarMyths and realities.’ (Publisher: KITLV, Leiden, 1996)
