= Museum of National Awakening =

- Museum Kebangkitan Nasional
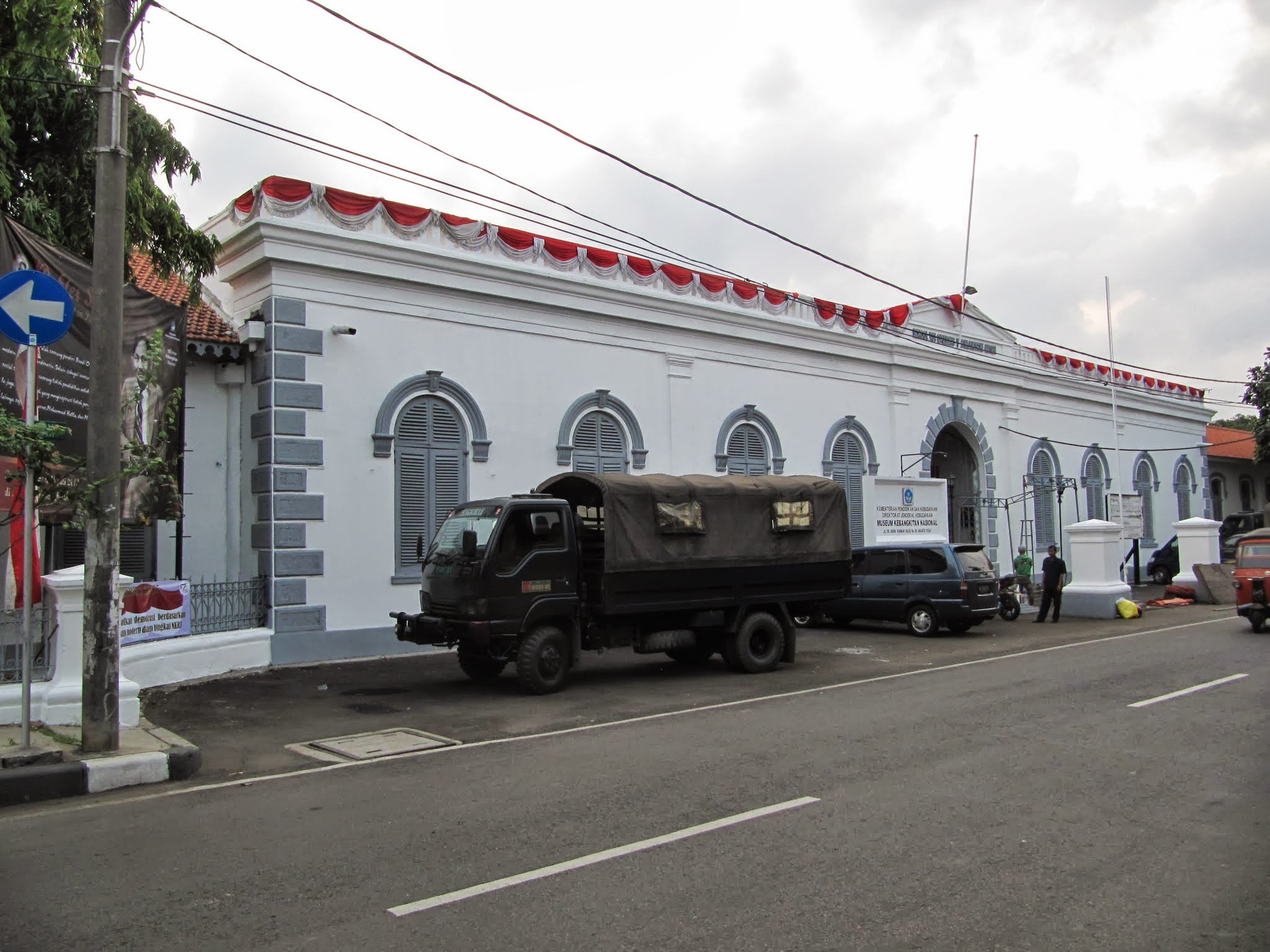
- Museum of National Awakening in 2013

- Location within Jakarta
- Established: May 8, 1999
- Location: Jl. Abdul Rachman Saleh 26 Jakarta 10410, Indonesia
- Coordinates: 6.178718°S 106.838034°E
- Type: History museum
- Collection size: 2,042 items
- Visitors: average 15,000 yearly
- Directors: Drs. Edy Suwardi, M.Hum
- Owner: Ministry of Culture
- Public transit access: Kwitang
- Website: http://www.museumkebangkitannasional.go.id

Museum of National Awakening (Indonesian: Museum Kebangkitan Nasional) is a history museum in Jakarta, Indonesia. The museum is dedicated for the history of Indonesian National Awakening.

== History ==
=== The building ===
The facade of the building in the 1920s.

The building of the museum was constructed from 1899 to 1901. In March 1902, the building was officially opened under the name of STOVIA, the colonial medicine school for the Javanese and other native people. Students were obliged to live in the dorm until the completion of the 10 years study.

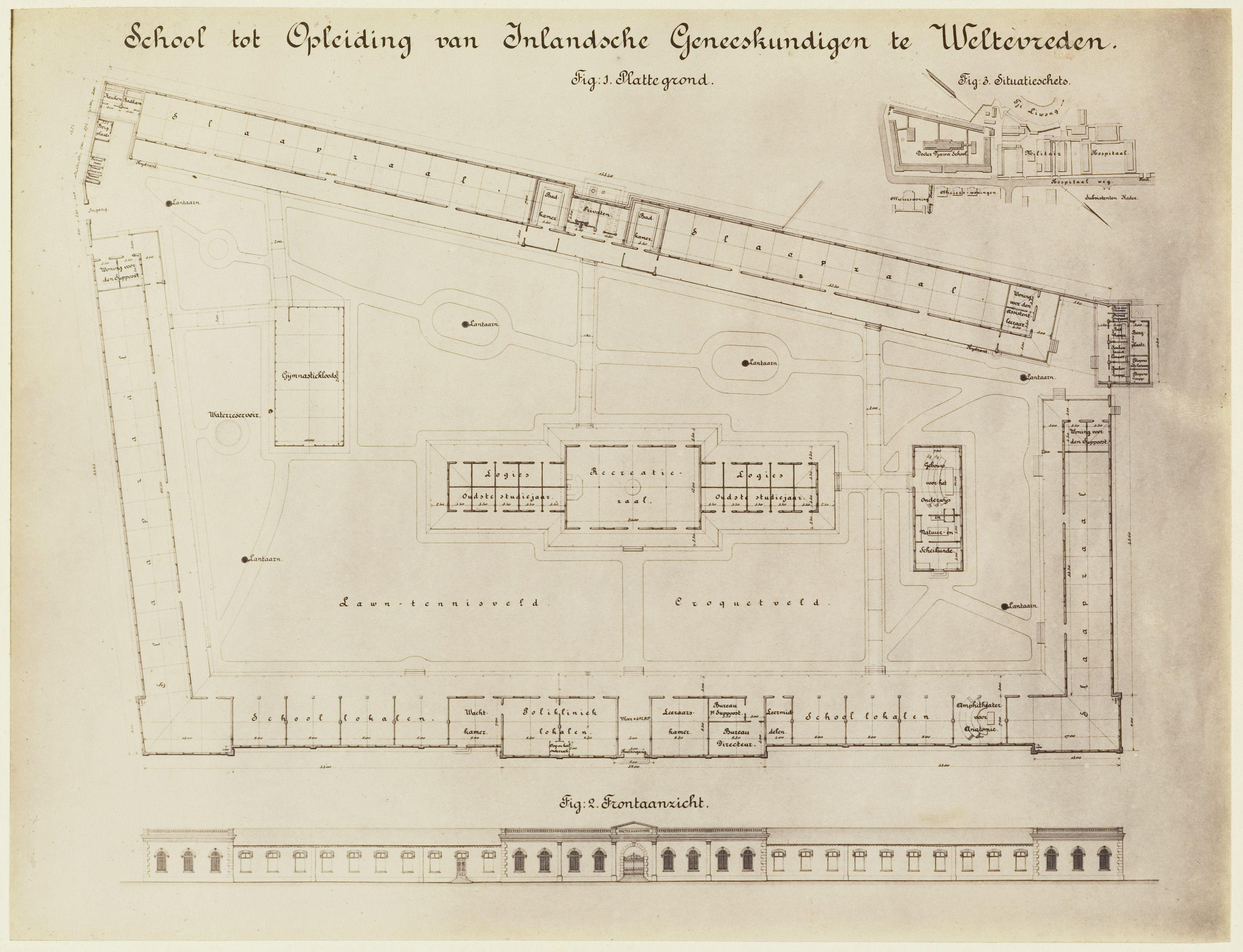
Original layout of the school

In 1920, because of the increasing number of students, studies were conducted in a new building (now the Medicine facility of the University of Indonesia). The building was then used as a MULO school (equivalent to junior high school), AMS (equivalent to senior high school) and school for pharmacist assistants.

During the Japanese occupation, the building was used by the Japanese to contain the Dutch war prisoners. After the independence of Indonesia, the building was used as temporary residences for the KNIL and their families.

=== The museum ===
Due to the building relation with the birth of Budi Utomo on May 20, 1908, whose day are officially Day of National Awakening since 1948, the building was restored by the government of Jakarta in April 1973. The building was officially made a heritage building by then President Suharto on May 20, 1974, under the name of Gedung Kebangkitan Nasional ("The Building of National Awakening"). The previous occupants were moved to Cengkareng area.

The building was initially made into four museums: Budi Utomo Museum, Museum of Women, Museum of Pers, and Museum of Health and Medicine. On February 7, 1984, the four museums were converged into the Museum of National Awakening.

== Collection ==
The building collects 2,042 items related to the Indonesian National Awakening including original furniture of the school building, medical equipment, medical costumes, weapons, photographs, paintings, sculptures, dioramas, miniatures, sketches and maps.

The museum is divided into four-themed exhibition rooms: "Room of Early Revolution", "Room of National Awareness", "Room of Revolution" and "Memorial Room to Boedi Oetomo".

== See also ==
- List of colonial buildings and structures in Jakarta
- List of museums and cultural institutions in Indonesia
