= University of Sarjanawiyata Tamansiswa in Yogyakarta =

Coordinates: 7.8015°S 110.3923°E

Universitas Sarjanawiyata Tamansiswa Yogyakarta
- Established: 15 November 1955
- Rector: Prof. Drs. H. Pardimin, M.Pd., Ph.D.
- Location: Yogyakarta, Indonesia
- Website: www.ustjogja.ac.id/

Universitas Sarjanawiyata Tamansiswa Yogyakarta is a university in Yogyakarta City in Indonesia.

The university has its origins in Taman Siswa, founded in 1922 by Ki Hajar Dewantara.
