= Public administration of Java =

In the past, Javanese administrative practices regulated public affairs and set behavioral norms in a succession of the island's notable empires, including Sailendra Mataram, Majapahit, the Demak confederacy, and seventeenth-century Mataram. This tradition continued before succumbing first to colonial practices, and subsequently to global standardization. Today these administrative practices survive in modified form as dominant elements of Indonesia's public administration.

== Javanese Administration ==
Javanese administration can be characterized as authoritarian, self-sufficient, and law-abiding. Its authoritarian nature meant that stability of the realm was dependent upon the abilities of whoever was in charge. Whether it was the raja, susuhunan, or sultan, he was somewhat of a semi-deified figure, and the administrative chain-of command led directly to him as master (gusti). All others, including the realm's highest officials, were his servants (kawula). The only exception was the royal family (sentana), whose more prominent members became the forerunners of an administrative system.

In theory, this was supposed to be a highly centralized form of administration, but it's dark weakness was that it was very unstable. Without a delegation of authority, the officials could only act as occasional substitutes for the king, rather than as authoritative stand-ins with well-defined duties and responsibilities. One part of this problem was the officials' lack of functional specialization: administrative self-sufficiency applied to everyone. As decreed by the king, local administration was to function with as little as possible input from the head. While the authority wielded by individual territorial rulers was recognized, in reality they were bound to the ruler by grants of titles (although only for the life-time of the holder) and marriage alliances, which raised the individual's status to that of the royal family. In other words, the local rulers from each territory had authority of their own, but due to certain decrees, they were essentially made to be part of the royal family, regardless of their "peasant" or "common" origin.

Local administrators collected taxes and received payment directly before the remainder was passed to the capital as the king's dues. Everyone in the realm was subjected to Javanese law. In practice this meant that traditions from the past would continue to be practiced in the present. As the head of the administration the king was the instrument of law, not its initiator, and was subjected to its contents.

== Colonial modifications ==
All of this was radically changed by the advent of the colonial state, which was also authoritarian, but in a different manner. The order of importance from the least authority/importance to the most now became: Sultan, susuhunan, or raja; colonial officials; the Governor General; the Colonial Office; the Netherlands government; and finally the Dutch Parliament. Administrative self-sufficiency was replaced by a centralized colonial hierarchy in which native officials were first placed at a relatively low level. These bureaucratic nobles (known as priyayi) were bound to the Dutch crown through the hereditary ranks and positions (enforced by marks of honor), which allowed almost unlimited exploitation of the Dutch colony's Native (inlander) subjects.

In contrast to this was the 'white-only' Dutch administrative corps, which was developing towards a rational European bureaucracy. Dutch Indies law had replaced Javanese law. The relatively small part that was still applicable to the Javanese (not Dutch or those who were 'honorary whites') was divided into five different customary law regions(adatrechtskringen) from the earlier universal, or at least Java-wide, ideal. Law became man made—through Dutch Parliament, administrative decree, or statutory custom (i.e. custom made into binding precedent) which was absolute, and obligatory.

== Global standards ==
With the exception of the last decade, authoritarian rule has been the norm rather than the exception during the lifetime of the Republic. Leaders have dictated administrative policy, with conformity being equated with loyalty to the regime. This was worsened by the fact that experienced administrators from the colonial period could not be recruited for service in the Republic of Indonesia (which was established in 1945). The newly developing European bureaucracy was repatriated after an internment from 1942-45 by the Japanese occupational forces; the bureaucratic nobles were corrupted from the power that had received, and had oriented themselves toward Dutch colonial priorities. As a result, when administrators were recruited, the administration was run on the basis of political criteria rather than training, experience, or seniority.

The most important rule of administrative conduct has become "as long as the boss is satisfied" (asal Bapak senang), an idea strengthened by the fact that the administrative elite has reserved for itself the right to interpret however they like the great number of vaguely worded laws and regulations. Dating from 1999, de-centralization laws have raised questions about administrative self-sufficiency vs. centralized control. Regardless of their contributions to regional and local self-rule, the laws have often contributed more to decentralize corruption than improve the government. Using licenses, laws, and certain authority to take away more than their fair share of local resources is reminiscent of traditional Javanese administration, as is the predominance of favoring family members (nepotism) and certain privileged groups of people.

The rule of law remains an ideal rather than a reality, as Indonesia's judicial institutions are one of the least trusted by its own citizens. Despite the undeniably impressive advances in political democracy during the present Reformation Era, the prevalence of a dysfunctional administrative system pervaded by corruption, collusion, and nepotism) calls into question the Republic's ability to attain its expressed desire of creating a modern, rational, Western way of administration.
