= National Education Day (Indonesia) =

Holiday in Indonesia

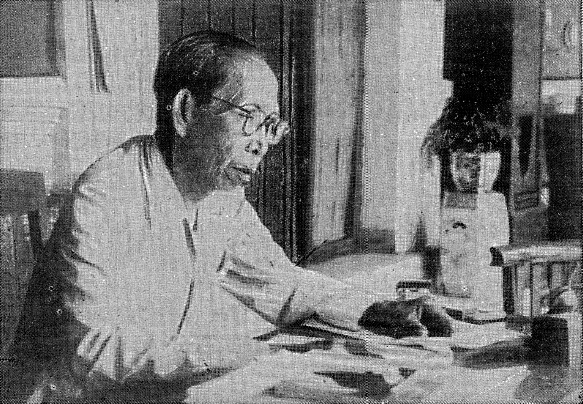
Ki Hadjar Dewantara

Indonesian National Education Day or Hari Pendidikan Nasional abbreviated as HARDIKNAS is celebrated on 2 May. It was initiated in remembrance of Ki Hajar Dewantara, the founder of the Taman Siswa education system. His educational philosophy Tut Wuri Handayani means that we can help others learn by coaching and mentoring.
