= Insulinde (political party) =

Political party

Insulinde (1913–1919), a direct successor of the Indische Party (IP) and later renamed the Nationale Indische Party (NIP), was a political organization that represented efforts by some Indo Eurasians to identify and cooperate with the Indigenous educated élite of the Dutch East Indies in an effort to establish an independent dominion. The organisation was mainly led by Indo-European and Javanese activists, but had a considerable membership in the South Moluccas. It was considered part of the more radical political wing in the colony, for which it faced much oppression from the colonial authorities.

== Foundation ==
Insulinde was the direct successor of the Indische Party (IP), with a strong Indo-European (Eurasian) following and was based in Semarang. When the 3 founders of the IP (E.F.E. Douwes Dekker, Tjipto Mangoenkoesoemo and Soewardi Soerjaningrat) were exiled to the Netherlands in 1913, the IP secretary became chairman of the newly established ‘’Insulinde’’. The ‘’Insulinde’’ leadership was immediately put under strict police surveillance, but retained a strong core following. 6 September, the founding day of the IP and coincidentally also the day the 3 IP founders sailed into exile was proclaimed 'IP Day' by ‘’Insulinde’’.

Still many former IP members were scared off by the harsh measures of the colonial authorities and refrained from joining ‘’Insulinde’’. Its magazine ‘De Express‘ lost subscriptions and came into financial difficulties only to be saved by the IP's so called TADO ‘’Tot Aan De Onafhankelijkheid’’ (Until The Independence) fund. The three former leaders of the IP, branded "embittered extremists" by the colonial government, were held in great esteem by the Insulinde members. During the 1913 Dutch imperial festivities Indo-Europeans of the ‘’Indische’’ party drove through white (totok) neighbourhoods in the big cities waving the IP banner.

== Insulinde Magazine ==
August 1914 Insulinde published its bi-weekly Dutch & Malay language paper, named ‘De Goentoer’ (The Thunder), edited by Javanese Insulinde member Darnakoesoemo, a close friend of IP leader Tjipto. To the great dismay of the authorities It still called for independence of the Dutch East Indies, “free of foreign tyranny” and defended the interests of indigenous and Indo people alike.

Contributors Darnakoesoemo and fellow Javanese Marco Kartodikromo a.k.a. Mas Marco, were considered “extremely dangerous” and were prosecuted for subversive activity by the authorities for which they served time. Mas Marco went to the Netherlands for 5 months after his sentence in 1916. In the Netherlands he was surprised and impressed, as other indigenous exiles and student activists were before him, by the much greater levels of freedom of speech and political freedom granted there.

Once back in the Dutch East Indies his writing became even more “radical”, and he was sentenced to a relatively heavy prison term of two years. The ’’Insulinde’’ party founded a committee and fund to support Mas Marco, his family and other persecuted activists.

== Insulinde & the ISDV ==
Dutch communist leader Henk Sneevliet co-founder of the ISDV, who had arrived in Java in 1913 initially believed ‘’Insulinde’‘ could be an effective vehicle to disseminate the socialist ideals and agenda in the colony. Some members of the ISDV (predecessor of the Indonesian Communist Party) however felt that Insulinde was waging a “race struggle” rather than a “class struggle” and called E.F.E. Douwes Dekker, a “nationalist anarchist” rather than a “social democrat”.

In its political struggle Insulinde was allied to the Sarekat Islam and ISDV, organizing protest rallies and meetings attended by thousands. Cooperation with the ISDV was ended in 1917 on the grounds that Insulinde believed that the Dutch leadership of that party was trying to drive a wedge between the Indigenous and Indo people.

In the end both the authorities and public opinion considered the Marxist aims of the ISDV to uproot and transform world order, more dangerous and extreme than Insulinde's aim for independence.

== Rise ==
Under the guidance of former IP leader Tjipto, who for health reasons had returned early from exile, the party flourished. In 1917 Insulinde gained a large majority at the council elections of the colonial capital Batavia. In both Semarang and Ambon city Ambonese political activists joined the party. Insulinde was the first political organization obtaining a serious foothold in the Moluccas. By June 1919 Insulinde had a membership of 17,000 members and was well represented in the Volksraad (Dutch East Indies) where it maintained close ties with Budi Utomo and the Sarekat Islam.

== Renamed NIP ==
With the return from exile of the other two former IP leaders Douwes Dekker and Soewardi Soerjaningrat the party decided to rekindle the IP's nationalist flame and renamed itself the Nationale Indische Party (NIP), National Indies Party in 1919. Again the colonial authorities thwarted any possibility for the NIP to become a mass movement by arresting NIP leaders.

When NIP membership numbers dropped, many of its Indo-European members joined the 1919 established Indo European Alliance (IEV), founded by Douwes Dekker's former colleague, friend and associate Karel Zaalberg.

The National Indies Party (NIP) became a predecessor of Sukarno's Indonesian National Party (PNI).

== See also ==
- Ernest Douwes Dekker
- P. F. Dahler
- Karel Zaalberg
- Dick de Hoog
