= Indische Party =

Indies Party Indische Partij Partai Hindia
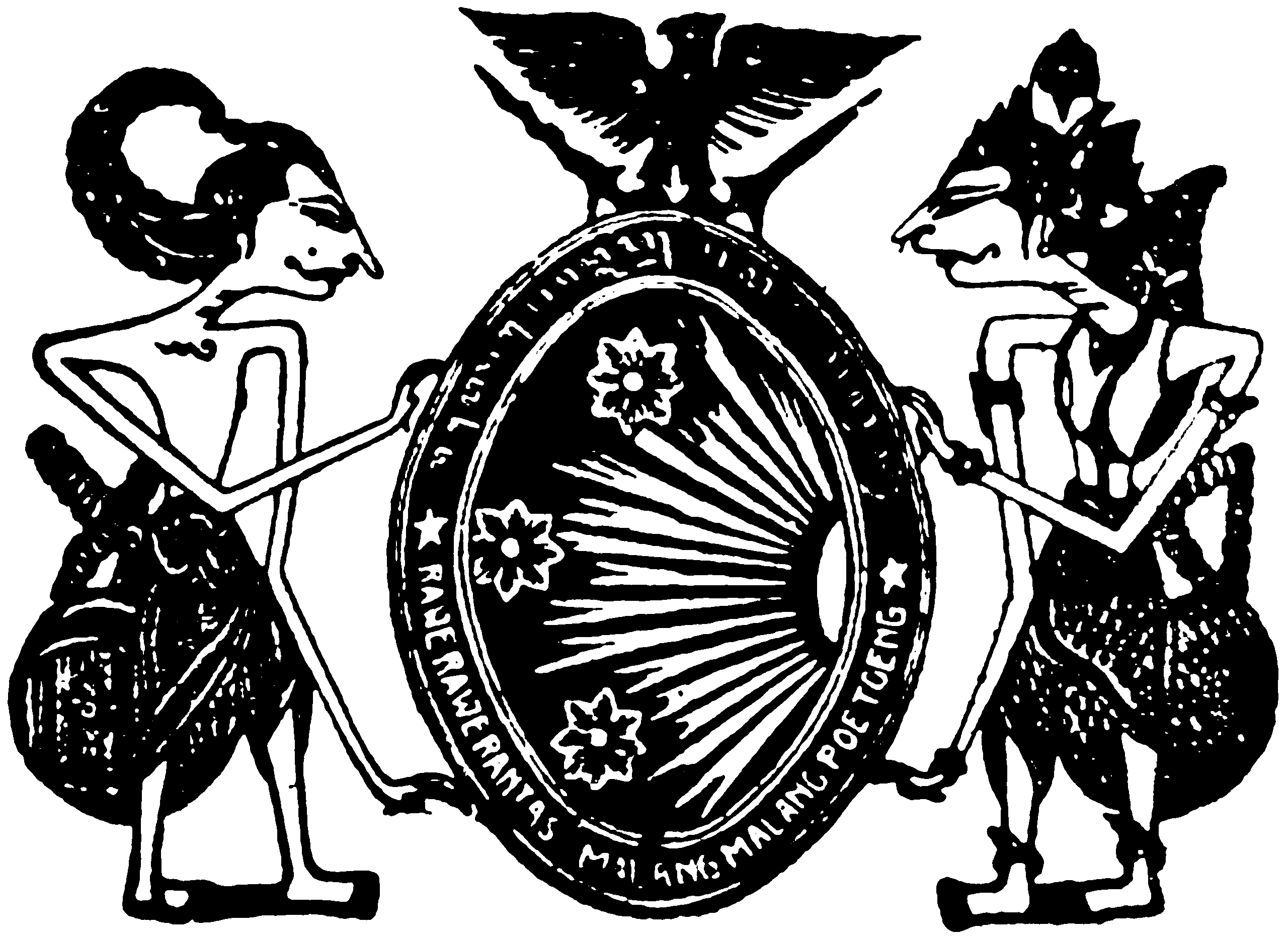
- The emblem of the Indische Party
- Chairman: Ernest Douwes Dekker
- Founders: Ernest Douwes Dekker; Tjipto Mangoenkoesoemo; Soewardi Soerjaningrat
- Founded: 25 December 1912
- Dissolved: 1913
- Split from: Indische Bond
- Succeeded by: Insulinde
- Headquarters: Bandoeng, Dutch East Indies
- Newspaper: De Express; Het Tijdschrift
- Membership (1913): 7,000
- Ideology: Indies nationalism Indo nationalism Independence
- Political position: Big tent
- Slogan: Indie voor Indiers

Party flag

The Indische Partij (IP) or Indies Party (Indonesian: Partai Hindia) was a short-lived but influential political organisation founded in 1912 by the Indo-European (Eurasian) journalist E.F.E. Douwes Dekker and the Javanese physicians Tjipto Mangoenkoesoemo and Soewardi Soerjaningrat. As one of the first political organisations pioneering Indonesian nationalism in the colonial Dutch East Indies it inspired several later organisations such as the Nationaal Indische Party (N.I.P.) or Sarekat Hindia in 1919 and Indo Europeesch Verbond (I.E.V.) in 1919. Its direct successor was Insulinde.

== Background ==
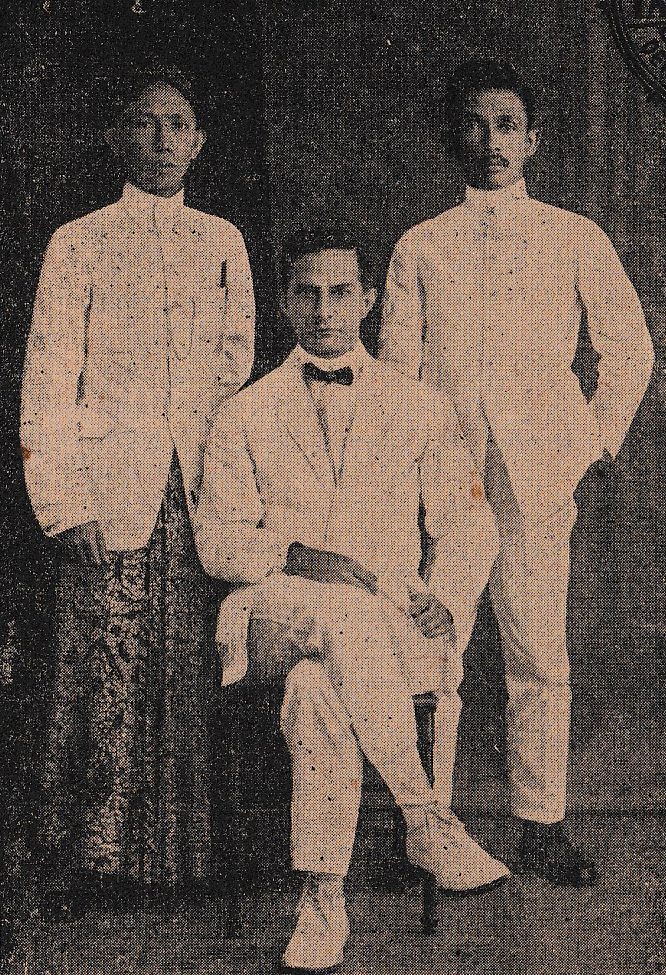
The triumvirate, Soerjadi Soerjaningrat (L), E.F.E. Douwes Dekker (M), Tjipto Mangunkusumo (R).

As an Indo, Douwes Dekker felt that there was discrimination between the Dutch totok (native), Indo (mixed) and Bumiputera (indigenous) social status by the Dutch East Indies government. The position and fate of the Indo were not much different from the Bumiputera. Destitute Indo's were found in Jakarta (Kemayoran), Semarang (Karangbidara), and Surabaya (Kerambangan). The totok Dutch viewed the Indo's as inferior to them. This view was expressed in the newsletter of the ‘Bond van geneesheeren’ (Association of doctors) in September 1912. In the bulletin, the native Dutch doctors denounced the government's intention to establish a second Medical School (NIAS) in Surabaya that was open to all nations. They considered the lowly Indo people unfit to become doctors.

According to Dekker, if Indo's wanted to change their fate, then they had to work together with the Bumiputera to bring about change. The Indies were not just for the full-blooded Dutch, but for everyone who felt they were an Indies (Hindia or Indian). This view became the basis of the nationalist ideology espoused by the Indische Partij.

Criticism of colonial life dates back to the early 20th century. Suwardi Suryaningrat criticised the Dutch East Indies government in his writings. Various writings containing his views on the unequal life of colonial society were published in newspapers and magazines such as Het Tijdschrift and De Expres. Suwardi was of the view that the domination of the Dutch totok group over Indo and Bumiputera people must end because it was based on the arbitrariness of the colonial government. In his writings, Suwardi pressed on the importance of Indies nationalism in every political struggle so as to end the exploitation carried out by the government. Meanwhile, Tjipto Mangunkusumo criticised it through his writings published in De Locomotief newspaper. According to him, Javanese society was difficult to progress because it was confined by feudalism and society as a whole experienced excessive exploitation. This led to so much poverty and backwardness that he thought colonialism had to end. According to him, the way to end colonialism was through political struggle. This is what caused Tjipto Mangunkusumo to leave Budi Utomo who did not share his views. Then he met with Dekker and Suwardi Suryaningrat who were like-minded and formed the Indische Partij.

== Foundation ==
Its influence as the first multi-racial political party that clearly stated the, at the time radical, notion of independence was far reaching. The IP's aim was to unite all native peoples of the Indies in a struggle for an independent nation. When the IP was banned and its leadership exiled, members of the IP founded the equally radical Insulinde. In Bandung, there have long been Indo-European organisations such as the Indische Bond (1898) and Insulinde (1907). Both organisations aimed to elevate the status of Indo-Europeans in the socio-economic field and forge an alliance with the Netherlands without separating from the mother country. This was, of course, the opposite of Dekker's thinking. In his speech to the members of the Indische Bond on 12 December 1911 entitled ‘Aansluiting tussen blank en bruin’ (The union of white and brown skin), Dekker stirred up the spirit of the Indo people to rebel and break away from the colonial government. And because of the small number of Indo's, they had to fight together with the Bumiputera with the Indo's being the pioneers.

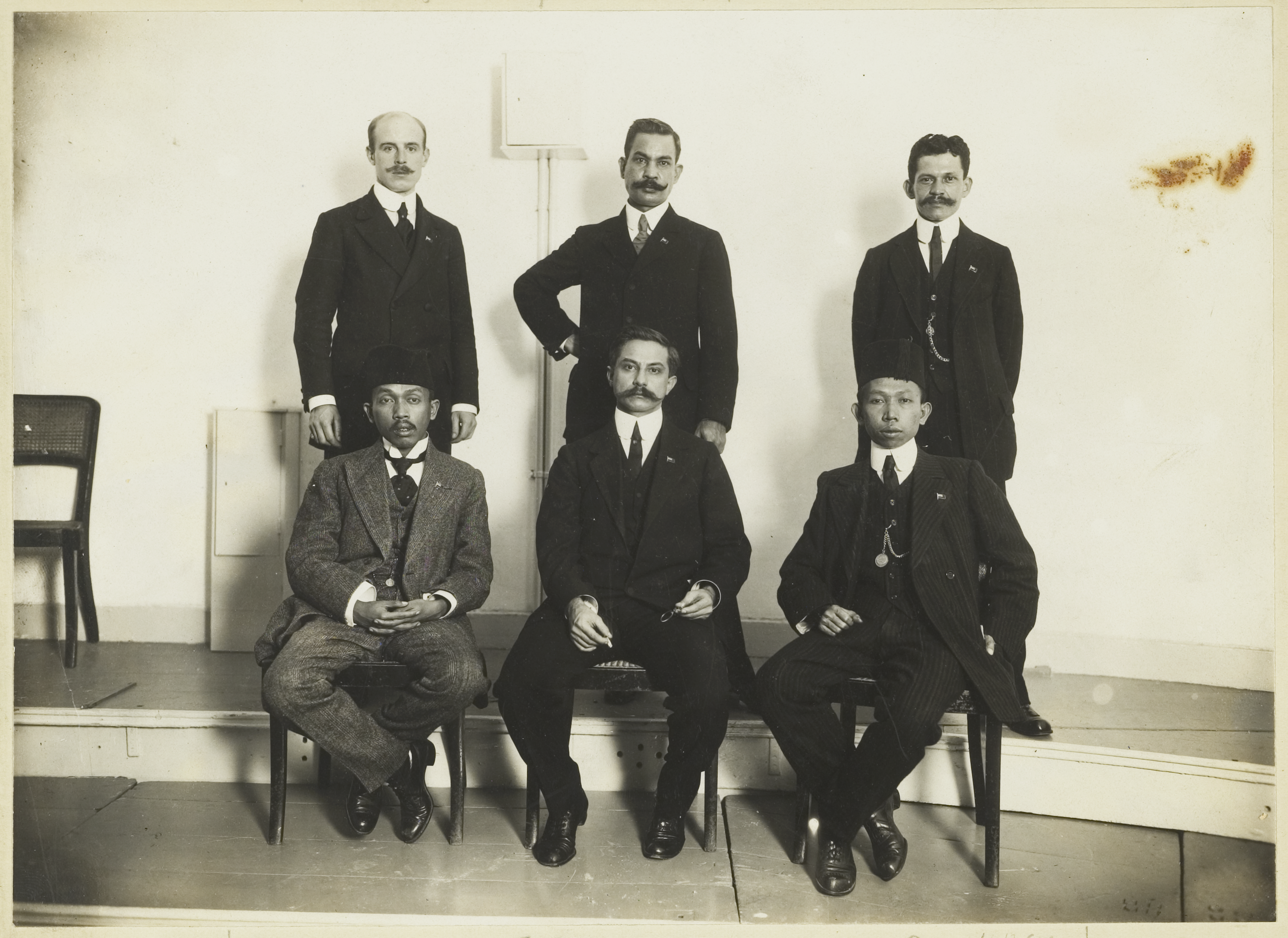
Indische Party members: (seated from left) Dr Tjipto Mangoenkoesoemo, Dr E.F.E. Douwes Dekker, R.M. Soewardi Soerjaningrat; (standing from left): F. Berding, G.L. Topée, and J. Vermaesen.

His speech influenced some members of the Indische Bond to form the Committee of Seven, which was tasked with preparing the formation of a new organisation. The Committee of Seven consisted of J. R. Agerbeek, J. D. Brunveld van Hulten, G. P. Charli, E. C. I. Couvreur, E. V. E. Douwes Dekker, J van der Poel, and R. H. Teuscher. On 6 September 1912, the Committee of Seven held a meeting under Dekker's leadership in Bandung and the result was the formation of a new association called the Indische Partij. On 15 September 1912, three important figures of the Indische Partij (E. V. E. Douwes Dekker, J van der Poel, and J. D. Brunveld van Hulten) moved to the cities of Yogyakarta, Madiun, Surabaya, Semarang, Pekalongan, Tegal, and Cirebon. In each city visited, meetings were held attended by various associations such as Insulinde Sarekat Islam, Budi Utomo, Kartini Club, Mangunhardjo, and Tiong Hoa Hwee Koan associations and established party branches.

Cipto Mangunkusumo joined Surabaya with 70 other people. He travelled all the way from Malang to meet his old friend because he saw the similarity in his political vision with Dekker. Meanwhile, Suwardi joined because Dekker was impressed by his writings in De Expres and Oetoesan Hindia. In November 1912, both were drawn to Bandung to become directors of the daily De Expres.

Dekker gave speeches at vergadering to attract the masses and this was new in the Dutch East Indies. At the vergadering in Bandung, Dekker said that the founding of the Indische Partij was a declaration of war: light against darkness; civilisation against tyranny; good against evil; colonial tax-paying slaves against the tax-collecting state, the Netherlands. His passionate speeches easily attracted large crowds. At a vergadering in Semarang on 18 September 1912, around 300 people came to listen to Dekker's speech. Those who could not join Budi Utomo because they were not Javanese were welcome in the Indische Partij; non-Muslims who were reluctant to join Sarekat Islam could move freely in the Indische Partij; progressives of Budi Utomo who were dissatisfied with the organisation could easily find political satisfaction in the Indische Partij; and revolutionary Sarekat Islamists had their wishes fulfilled by joining the Indische Partij.

Revolutionary action enables people to achieve their objectives quickly. Surely this is not immoral [...] The Indische Party can safely be called revolutionary. Such a word does not frighten us[...]

— Douwes Dekker

Due to the great enthusiasm of the people of the Dutch East Indies for the Indische Partij, within four months it had 25 branches with 5,775 members. The Surabaya branch of Indische Partij at that time had 827 members, Semarang 1,375, Jakarta 809, and Bandung 740. Indische Partij could attract up to 7,000 members and around 1,000 of them were Bumiputera. Indische Partij also had 30 branches throughout the Dutch East Indies. Not only that, Indische Partij also accepted members of Chinese, Arab and other descent. Under the slogan of “Indie voor Indiers” membership was opened to Indo-Europeans, Dutch permanent settlers, Indo-Chinese natives and all indigenous peoples. Inspired by the leading role Eurasian Ilustrados had played in the independence struggle in the Philippines, the IP envisioned a similar uniting role for the Indo Eurasians in the Indies. Over 5,000 of its 7,000 members were Indos.

The coloured [Indo] rejected by his white father, is the ideal foreman in the final liberation of his indigenous relatives.

— Douwes Dekker

Douwes Dekker however also warned the Indo community not to carry on the racist notions indoctrinated by the colonial system.

[...] colonial policy and its colonial morality are rotten. This is of course what the Indische Partij aims at in its struggle against racial superiority and racial discrimination [...] It will give the final push to make the tree of racial discrimination crash to earth [...] But when Indos of mixed blood complain about this racial superiority they must take care not to become guilty themselves of the same sin with respect to the indigenous natives. They must realize that artificially inculcated ideas of belonging to the ruling classes do by no means give them the right to look down on a class of (indigenous) Indiers with whom they are bound together with unbreakable chains [...]

— Douwes Dekker

In 1912 the removal of the Batavia school for Civil Servants from the Dutch East Indies and the ban on establishing a Medical school for Indo-Europeans and Indo-Chinese had contributed to a strong undercurrent of dissatisfaction and the IP membership numbers were rising speedily. Within a month the Party's magazine had a 1,000 paying subscribers. In fear of a Malay language edition and collaboration with the ‘Sarekat Islam’ the colonial authorities stepped up its efforts to ban the IP.

== Programs and beliefs ==
The Indische Partij made several efforts to create co-operation between Indo and Bumiputera people. These efforts included:

- Absorbing the national ideals of the Indies (Indonesia)
- Eradicating social arrogance in relationships, both in government and society
- Eradicating various efforts that resulted in inter-religious hatred
- Increasing pro-Indies influence in the government
- Seek rights for all Indiers
- In teaching, aim for the economic interests of the Indies and strengthen the economy of the weak.

After the end of the propaganda journey, on 25 December 1912 a meeting of Indische Partij representatives was held. In this meeting, the Articles of Association and the party's management were drawn up. The composition of the board was as follows:

- Chairman: E.F.E Douwes Dekker
- Deputy: dr Tjipto Mangunkusumo
- Committee: J.G van Ham
- Treasurer: G.P Charli
- Helpers: J.R Agerbeek and J.D Brunveld van Hulten

The black flag was used as the party flag. Some interpreted the black colour as identical to the colour of Indier skin. There are also those who interpret it as the colour of mourning because the country has not yet become independent. In the right corner, there is a tri-colour strip of green-red-blue. The green colour symbolises the goal to be achieved, namely prosperity, the red colour symbolises the spirit of the party's courage, and the blue colour symbolises the indier's loyalty to his homeland. The Indies was a national home for all people of Bumiputera, Dutch, Chinese, Arab and other descent who recognised the Indies as their homeland and nationality. This understanding emulsified into what was known as Indisch Nationalism, which later through the Indonesian Association and the Indonesian National Party became Indonesisch Nationalism or Indonesian Nationalism.

== Struggle for legality ==
In 1913, the government announced plans to establish a representative council in the Dutch East Indies under the name Koloniale Raad or Council of the Colonies. Neither the name nor the composition of the council was approved by the ‘Bumi Putra’ committee because the name Koloniale Raad was an insult to the national movement. It was certain that it would defend the colonisers and ignore the interests of the people. Therefore, the Koloniale Raad was naturally opposed by the nationalists. The nationalists who were members of various organisations rejected the Koloniale Raad and demanded that the House of Representatives elected by the Dutch East Indies government be balanced, between foreigners and natives. Some of the Bandung branch of the Islamic Union such as Soewardi Surjaningrat, Abdoel Moeis, and Akhmad Hassan Wignjadisastra who were actively involved in the Indische Partij and might influence the native population to fight the colonisers so the government had to be careful.

On 25 December 1912, the Indische Partij leaders went to the Bogor Palace to gain recognition from the Dutch East Indies government. This was important so that the Indische Partij would not be considered a wild and unsettling association. Upon seeing Dekker's application for legal recognition of the Indische Partij, the government assigned its advisor on indigenous affairs, Dr G.H.J Hazeu, to investigate Dekker. On 13 January 1913, a report on Dekker containing his personal background, ideas and ideals as well as the influence of his propaganda on the people of the Dutch East Indies was submitted to Governor-General, Alexander Idenburg.

On 4 March 1913, Governor-General Idenburg officially rejected the Indische Partij board's application to obtain legal entity status by referring to article 111 of the Regerings-Reglement or Government Regulation of 1854. The use of the article itself surprised the Indische Partij board because the Dutch East Indies government had long intended to abandon the article.

After learning of the rejection decision, on 5 March, Dekker and the other board members held a discussion about the next step. The meeting resulted in a decision to change the wording of article 2 regarding the purpose of the Indische Partij. After that, Dekker went back to Idenburg, but was again rejected in a decision letter dated 11 March 1913 on the grounds that although the wording of article 2 was changed, it did not in any way intend to change the basis and spirit of the organisation. On 13 March, Dekker tried a third time but was still rejected. At that time Dekker questioned whether the future government would grant independence to the colonies. Idenburg shook his head and stated that the issue of independence for the Dutch East Indies did not matter.

== Banning ==
Explicitly and vigorously opposing widespread racial discrimination by the colonial elite of expatriate Dutchmen and advocating total independence from the Netherlands, the colonial government hastened to brand the political organisation as subversive and banned it only one year after its foundation. Having been designated a banned organisation, the party leadership decided to dissolve the Indische Partij on 31 March 1913. With heavy heart, Dekker's final message to his members was that they should join the government-recognised Insulinde association with the spirit of the Indische Partij. Its activities were continued by Insulinde, which was based in Semarang. The date 6 September, when the Indische Partij was formed, is celebrated as Indische Partij Day. Although the government's strict measures resulted in many Indische Partij members losing their nerve, De Expres continued to survive. In 1914, business cards, papers and the like with Indische Partij colours were still advertised in De Expres.

The triumvirate continued to voice their criticism of the government through De Expres. For example, when the Dutch East Indies government wanted to celebrate the 100th anniversary of Dutch independence from Napoleon Bonaparte in the Dutch East Indies by collecting money from the people, they formed the ‘Bumiputera Committee' in July 1913 headed by Tjipto. This committee later congratulated the queen and asked her to revoke article 111 of the R.R. and immediately convene an Indies Parliament.

Meanwhile, Suwardi Suryaningrat wrote an article satirising the Dutch East Indies government entitled Als ik eens nederlander Was or ‘If I were a Dutchman’. The contents of Suwardi's writing include:

"... If I were a Dutchman, I would protest the commemoration that would be held. I would warn my fellow colonisers that it was actually very dangerous at that time to celebrate the independence anniversary. I would warn all Dutch people not to offend the civilisation of the Indonesian people who are just waking up and becoming brave. I will protest as loudly as I can..."

— Suwardi Suryaningrat

Then Tjipto Mangunkusumo also wrote an article entitled Kracht of Vrees? which means ‘Power or Fear?’. As a result, they were both arrested by the Dutch and exiled. Later Dekker protested against the arrest of his two friends and wrote Onze Helden: Tjipto Mangunkusumo en R.M. Suwardi Suryaningrat (Our Heroes: Tjipto Mangunkusumo and R.M. Suwardi Suryaningrat). He to was arrested.

The activities of the committee initiated by this triumvirate were considered dangerous by the government so that based on article 48 of the R.R, Governor-General Idenburg sentenced them to exile. Initially 18 August 1913 on domestic exile, and then changed to foreign exile on 27 August, to the Netherlands. With the exile of the Indische Partij leaders, the Indische Partij's work in Indonesia ended. Van Deventer likened the organisation to a stillborn baby, meaning that the Indische Partij could not prove its greatness amidst the national movement organisations because the Dutch East Indies government had already dissolved it.

The exile of E.F.E. Douwes Dekker was lifted in August 1917, Suwardi Suryaningrat in July 1918, and Dr Tjipto Mangunkusumo in July 1914. They were able to remain politically active and eventually return to the Dutch East Indies. Upon arrival in the Dutch East Indies, Dr Tjipto Mangunkusumo engaged in politics and later became a member of the PNI. Meanwhile, Dekker and Suwardi plunged into education. They each founded the ‘Ksatrian Instituut’ school and the Taman Siswa school, which meant strengthening the ranks of private schools that had been pioneered by the Muhammadiyah school. Tjipto became future president Sukarno's second political mentor, after an imprisonment in Banda he died in 1943. After Indonesia's declaration of independence in 1945 Douwes Dekker, now named Danoedirdja Setiaboeddhi to sound Indonesian, became minister of state in the cabinet of Indonesian prime minister Sjahrir. Soewardi became Indonesian minister of education in 1949, having changed his name to Ki Hadjar Dewantara in 1922.

== See also ==
- P.F. Dahler
- Karel Zaalberg
