= Indonesian nationalism =

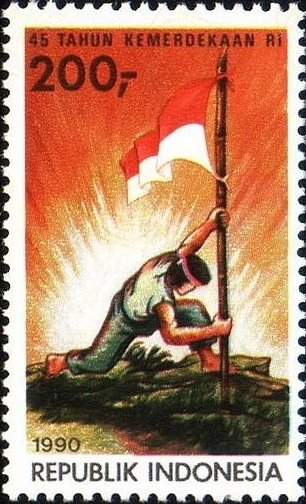
1990 Indonesian stamp commemorating the 45th anniversary of Indonesian independence.

Indonesian nationalism is an ideology that first originated during the Dutch colonial era in the Dutch East Indies which called for the colony's independence and unification as an independent and sovereign nation. This period of nationalist development under colonial rule is often called the Indonesian National Awakening. After Indonesia declared independence in 1945 and was recognized as independent of the Netherlands in 1949 following the Indonesian National Revolution, Indonesian nationalism persisted as a set of ideologies supporting the continued independence and development of the newly formed country.

Indonesian nationalism primarily emerged in urban areas where it subsequently diffused to rural areas. Indonesian nationalism has been described as emerging in the early 20th century with the 1908 establishment of Budi Utomo. Prince Diponegoro has been considered a forerunner to the Indonesian nationalist movement, owing to his opposition to Dutch colonial rule in the 19th century.

As Indonesia is multiethnic, Indonesian nationalism does not consist of advocacy for a single ethnic group; Indonesian nationalism is closely related to state nationalism. Also, Indonesian nationalism takes diverse forms and has at times manifested as civic nationalism, religious nationalism, and left-wing nationalism. Some of those forms are exemplified in Indonesia's national motto Bhinneka Tunggal Ika which means "Unity in Diversity" in Old Javanese, in the country's foundational ideology of Pancasila, or in contemporary laws which guarantee ethnic and religious diversity.

== Background ==
The National Monument with Indonesian national flags in the foreground

Early political associations in Indonesia have been described by scholars as 'particularist' and regional, due to a low level of political mobilization and Dutch restrictions on party membership.

Founded in 1908, Budi Utomo is often regarded as the first modern nationalist organization in Indonesia, though it was explicitly Javanese. However, the first nationalist organization to gain a mass following was the Sarekat Islam (Islamic Union), originally founded to oppose Chinese migrant economic competition. At the Sarekat Islam Congress in 1916, board president Oemar Said Tjokroaminoto outlined his vision of nationalism: "we hope sincerely for the establishment of self-government for the Netherlands Indies, or at least the creation of a Colonial Council so that we will be able to participate in administrative policymaking." Other large religious organizations include the Muhammadijah, founded in 1912, and the Nahdatul Ulama, founded in 1926.

Around 1920, the word "Indonesia" came into its modern usage. Initially created by an English naturalist George Windsor Earl in 1850 to classify the ethnic and geographic area, "Indonesia" was seized upon by nationalists as a word to imagine a unity of peoples. As Adrian Vickers notes, "[p]reviously the Youth Alliances had talked about a separate Balinese nation, Javanese nation, Sumatran nation, and so on, now 'Indonesia' spoke of a single people".

== History ==
The first nationalist movement in Indonesia emerged in the early 20th century, developing in response to the establishment of the Dutch Ethical Policy. On 28 October 1928, the All-Indonesian Youth Congress proclaimed the Youth Pledge (Indonesian: Sumpah Pemuda), establishing the nationalist goals of: "one country — Indonesia, one people — Indonesian, and one language — Indonesian". According to Jacques Bertrand, "[t]he 1920s to the 1940s constituted the formative period of the Indonesian nation."

Formed in 1927, the Indonesian National Party led by Sukarno established its objectives as "the full independence of Indonesia and the establishment of democratic political institutions." However, the emerging nationalist movement faltered as major nationalist leaders including Sukarno, Sutan Sjahrir, and Mohammad Hatta were arrested and exiled by Dutch colonial authorities.

Near the end of Japanese occupation during World War II, the nationalist movement expanded as nationalist leaders cooperated with the Japanese to advance their vision of independence. In a speech delivered in Jun 1945, Sukarno proposes Pancasila (the Five Pillars) as the founding principles of the new Indonesian state: "nationalism," "humanitarianism," "democracy," "social justice," and "belief in almighty God." However, religious and ethnic tensions remained present.

== See also ==
- Indonesians
- Pribumi
- Nusantara
