= STOVIA =

Coordinates: 6°10′43″S 106°50′17″E

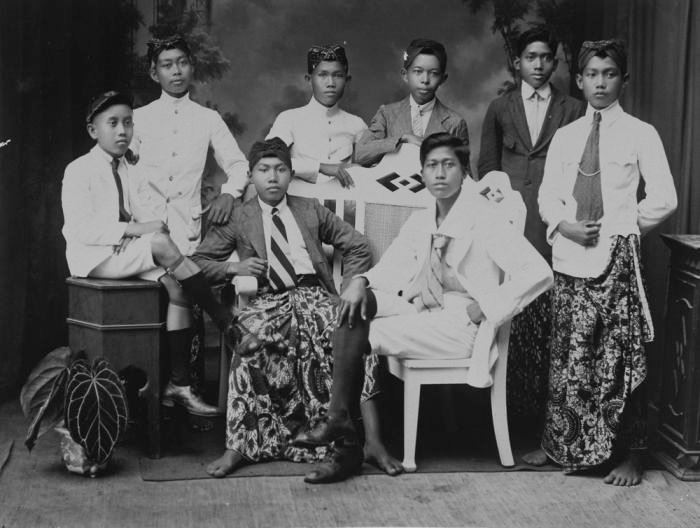
STOVIA students (1920-1933)

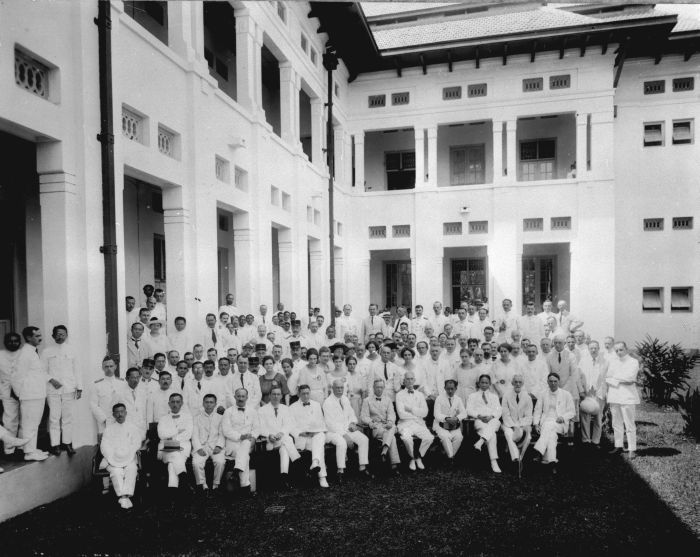
Group portrait at STOVIA (1920-1933)

The School tot Opleiding van Inlandsche Artsen ("school for the training of native physicians") or STOVIA was a medicine school in Batavia, now Indonesia's capital Jakarta. The school was officially opened in March 1902 in a building that is now the Museum of National Awakening in Weltevreden, an affluent district of Batavia.

== Notable alumni ==
- Djamaluddin Adinegoro, journalist
- Djoehana Wiradikarta, biologist
