= Cipto Mangunkusumo =

Indonesian independence leader

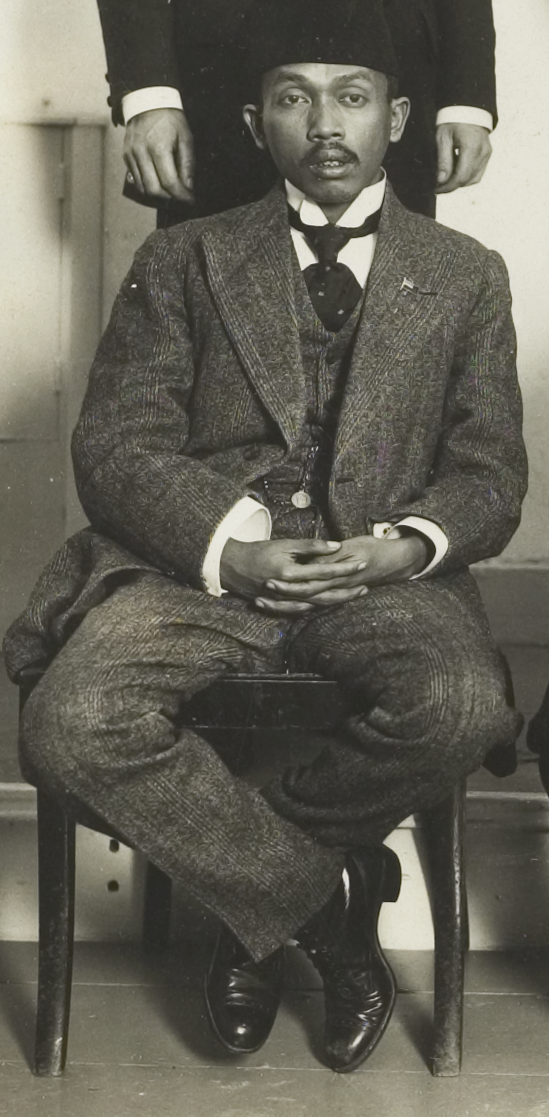
- Cipto Mangunkusumo
- Born: 4 March 1886; Pecangaan, Dutch East Indies
- Died: 8 March 1943 (aged 57); Jakarta, Japanese-occupied East Indies
- Occupations: Politician, activist, writer
- Spouse: Marie Vogel

Cipto Mangunkusumo (EVO: Tjipto Mangoenkoesoemo) (born 4 March 1886 in Pecangakan, Ambarawa, Semarang – 8 March 1943 in Batavia) was a prominent Indonesian independence leader and Sukarno's political mentor. Together with Ernest Douwes Dekker and Soewardi Soerjaningrat, he was one of the three founders of the influential Indische Party, a political party disseminating the idea of self-government of the Dutch East Indies. After the party was labeled subversive by the colonial court of law in 1913, he and his fellow IP leaders were exiled to the Netherlands.

Cipto advocated an Indies-based nationalism rather than Javanese nationalism. Unlike other Javanese nationalist leaders, Cipto's belief in democracy remained strong until the end of his life, and in his view, the traditional character of feudal Javanese civilization had to change. He considered Western education and its subsequent social and cultural dislocation as indispensable in creating a revolutionary atmosphere. He disagreed with Budi Utomo's emphasis on the reinvigoration of traditional Javanese civilization. In a 1916 debate, he stated: "The psyche of the Javanese people needs to be changed to such an extent that a change of language, or more cynically a killing of a language becomes urgent. Only in this way will it be possible to build another language on its ruins and also another civilization."

Cipto married his Indo (Eurasian) wife Marie Vogel in 1920.

When the three IP leaders returned to the Dutch East Indies his two companions eventually took the path of education, while Cipto remained politically active. After his exile, he was involved in the Insulinde Political Party which was transformed into the new "Nationaal Indische Party" of which he became one of the leaders and its representative in the Peoples Assembly (Volksraad).

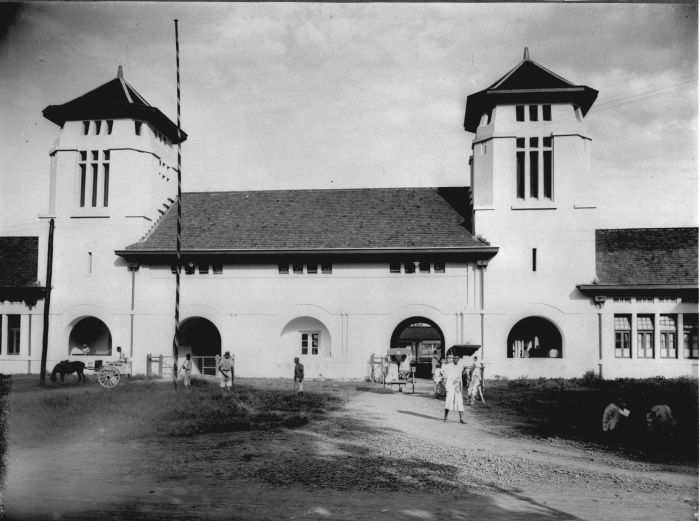
'Centrale Burgerlijke Ziekeninrichting Salemba' renamed the 'Cipto Mangunkusumo Hospital' in honour of Cipto.

When Sukarno, future President of Indonesia, moved to Bandung, he gradually alienated himself from his first political mentor and father-in-law Tjokroaminoto (leader of the Sarekat Islam). Cipto then became his main political mentor and turned him into a convinced radical nationalist.

"In some ways this close relationship between Cipto and Sukarno was not surprising; both were highly intelligent men and extremely sensitive to the reality of the colonial situation, an injustice they took as a personal insult."

Letter (1928)

Both men were relentless and uncompromising independence fighters professing a deep concern with the plight of the poor peasant. However, unlike his political pupil, Cipto's often courageous actions showed a proven track record of practically improving the social predicament of peasants. As early as 1910 Cipto had devoted his unstinting services to the Javanese people during an outbreak of the plague. For his efforts, he was awarded a royal decoration in the Order of Orange-Nassau, by the colonial government.

After the NIP's involvement in the farmers' strike in central Java, the party was banned. Cipto co-founded the National Party of Indonesia (PNI), chaired by Sukarno. Soon thereafter he attempted to foment revolt among the Indonesians serving in the KNIL and was exiled again in 1927, this time to Banda. On Banda, he was later joined by other leading revolutionaries like Hatta and Sjahrir. However, during his 11-year-long exile, he was unable to further any significant political activity.

He died in 1943 and was buried in Ambarawa.

After Indonesian independence, the 'Centrale Burgerlijke Ziekeninrichting Salemba' was renamed the 'Cipto Mangunkusumo Hospital'.

== Legacy ==
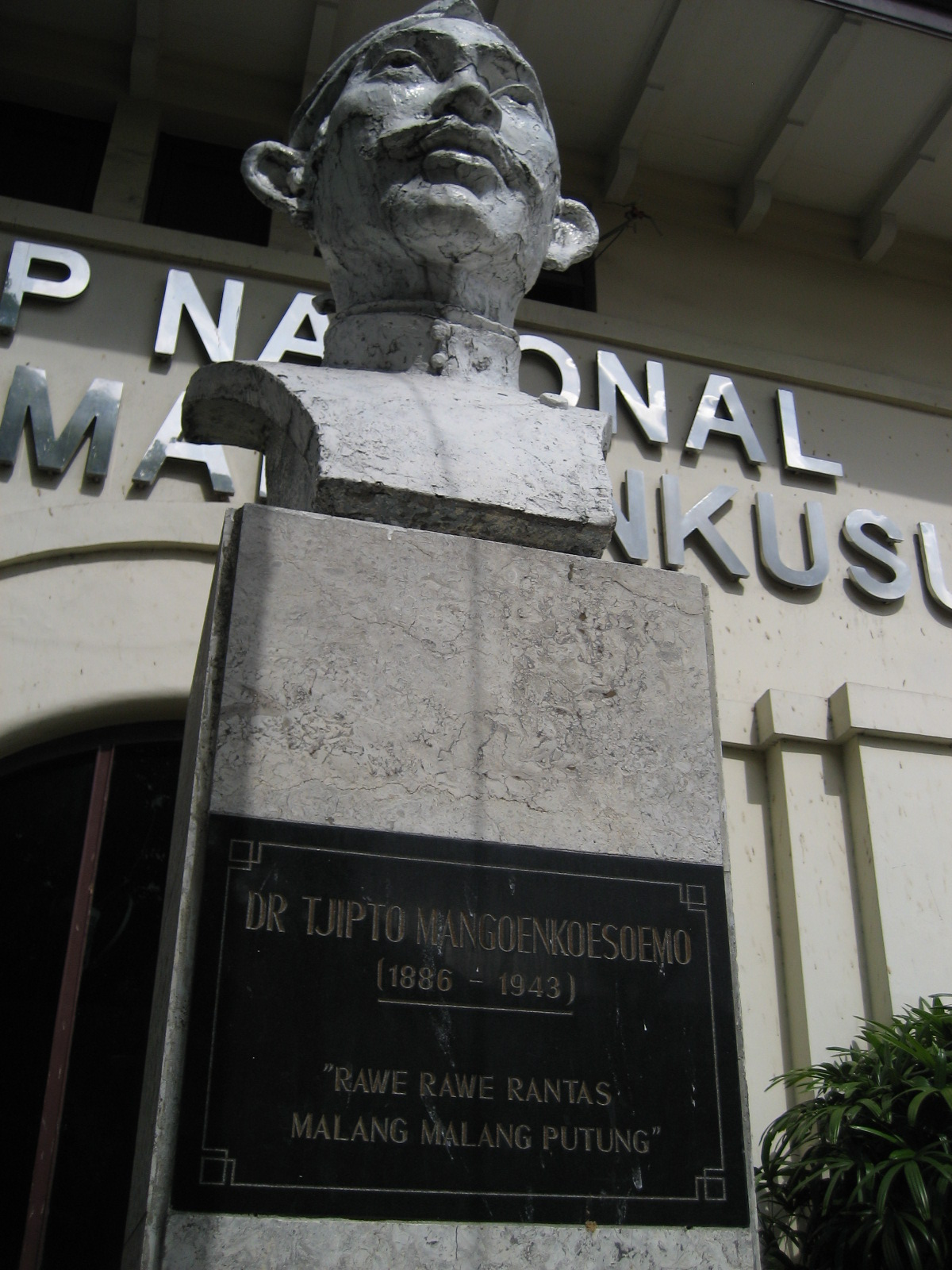
Cipto Mangunkusumo statue at the Cipto Mangunkusumo hospital in the city of Jakarta

Dr. Cipto Mangunkusumo Hospital is named after him, and his face appears in the 2016 series of the 200 Indonesian rupiah coins.
