= Taman Siswa =

Javanese educational movement

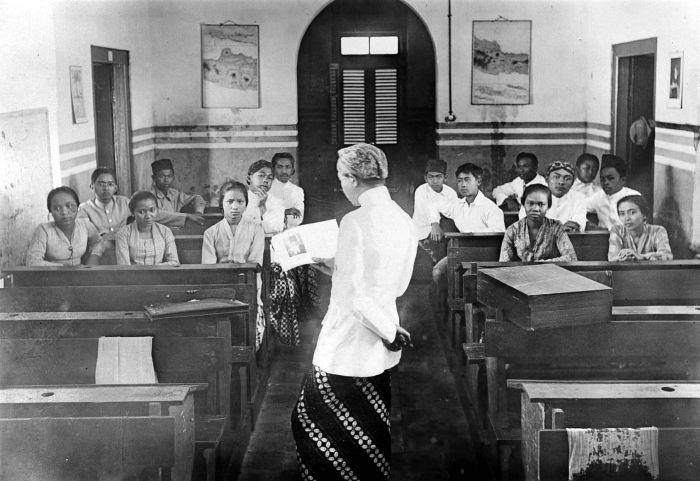
A Classroom at a Taman Siswa school in Bandung

Taman Siswa (lit. 'Garden of Pupils'), officially the Tamansiswa Educational Association Based in Yogyakarta (Indonesian: Persatuan Perguruan Tamansiswa Berpusat di Yogyakarta), was a Javanese educational movement and school system founded by Ki Hadjar Dewantara in 1922. It began by founding a kindergarten (Taman Idria) and then through adding schools at various levels it established a University (Universitas Sarjanawiyata Tamansiswa) in 1959.

== Sources ==
- Meijers, C. H., 1973, De Taman Siswa en het regeringsonderwijs: Ontwikkelingen in het Indonesische onderwijs vanaf 1945. Amsterdam: Doctoraalscriptie.
- Reksohadiprodjo, Mohammad Said, 1976, Taman Siswa's Gedachten Wereld. Jakarta, Indonesia: Yayasan Idayu.
- Tsuchiya, Kenji, 1988, Democracy and Leadership: The Rise of the Taman Siswa Movement in Indonesia. Honolulu, HI: University of Hawaii Press, ISBN 0-8248-1157-7
- Ki Hadjar Dewantara, 1935, Een en ander over Nationaal Onderwijs en het Instituut 'Taman Siswa' te Jogjakarta
- Tuin, J. van der, 1996, Voor volk of vaderland? De intenties van de overheid aangaande het 'wilde onderwijs' in Nederlands-Indië, 1920-1940. Leiden: RU-Leiden, doctoraalscriptie pedagogiek/onderwijskunde
