= Indonesian National Awakening =

Historical nationalist movement and time period

The Indonesian National Awakening (Indonesian: Kebangkitan Nasional Indonesia) is a term for the period in the first half of the 20th century, during which people from many parts of the archipelago of Indonesia first began to develop a national consciousness as "Indonesians".

In the pursuit of profits and administrative control, the Dutch imposed an authority of the Dutch East Indies on a variety of peoples who had not previously shared a unified political identity. By the start of the 20th century, the Dutch had formed the territorial boundaries of a colonial state that became the precursor to modern Indonesia.

In the first half of the 20th century, new organisations and leadership developed. Under its Ethical Policy, the Netherlands helped create an educated Indonesian elite. These profound changes amongst the indigenous Indonesian population are often referred to as the "Indonesian National Revival". They were accompanied by increased political activism and culminated in Indonesian nationalists' proclaiming independence on 17 August 1945.

== Background ==
Several factors gave rise to a nationalist consciousness: the indigenous print media, urbanisation, communism, Islam, education, mass entertainment (such as film, stambul theatre, and kroncong music), and suffering under Dutch apartheid. Nationalists helped incubate a national consciousness. Leading intellectuals such as Kartini, Tirto, and Semaun gave voice and sentiment to the idea of a unified archipelago. These leaders, along with many others, sought to embrace "modernity" and nation, "freedom" (merdeka) and independence.

Indigenous voices were suppressed by the Dutch, who disallowed freedom of speech and freedom of assembly, and who extensively spied on dissident organisations. Indeed, only a small number raised their voices against colonialism, with most people avoided the Dutch as best they could and with the aristocracy "content to collaborate." "The modern movement against colonial rule was maintained by the passion and commitment of a few remarkable men and women."

The movement had its beginnings in the late 19th century, a period of Dutch Indies government consolidation that significantly reinforced their governance over much of the area that is now in the 21st century the national Indonesian territorial boundaries. Kartini was one such individual who provided the impetus and ideology which inspired patriotic nationalists to pursue their ideals despite the adversity. Kartini's intellect was awakened by quality Dutch classical education and her traditional Islamic beliefs and education. Kartini was supported by an enlightened and intellectually endowed family and friends in Europe and Indonesia. Kartini maintained her inquisitiveness and incorporated feminist principles, community welfare and education in her pursuit of the national Indonesian identity and her quest to modernise her traditional society, advocating changes in gender status and principles of individual and national self-determination to realise the Indonesian universal dream of independence and self governance.

== Education ==
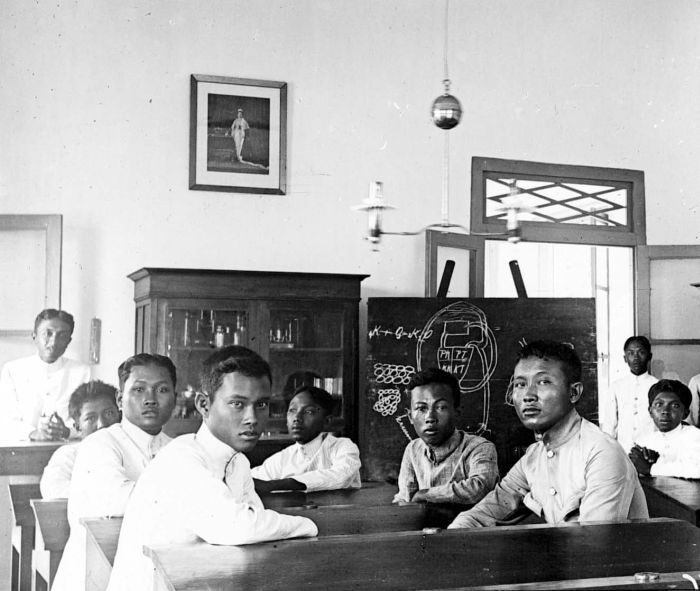
Students of an Agricultural School in Tegalgondo, Central Java. ca. 1900–1940.

At the start of the 20th century, the number of secondary educated Indonesians was almost negligible and from this time on, the Ethical Period saw the colonial government expand secondary educational opportunities to indigenous Indonesians. In 1925, the government's focus shifted to the provision of a widespread three-year elementary vocational education.

In 1940, over 2 million students were attending such schools which is thought to have improved the 6.3 per cent literacy rate recorded in the 1930 census. Dutch medium education opened new horizons and opportunities, and was in strong demand by Indonesians.

In 1940, 65,000 to 80,000 Indonesian students were in Dutch and Dutch-supported primary schools, equivalent to 1 percent of the relevant age group. Around the same time, there were 7,000 Indonesian students in Dutch medium secondary schools. The vast majority of students attended intermediate MULO schools.

Although the numbers of enrolled students were small compared to the total relevant age group, the Dutch medium education was of high quality and from the 1920s on began to produce a new educated Indonesian elite.

== Indonesian nationalism ==
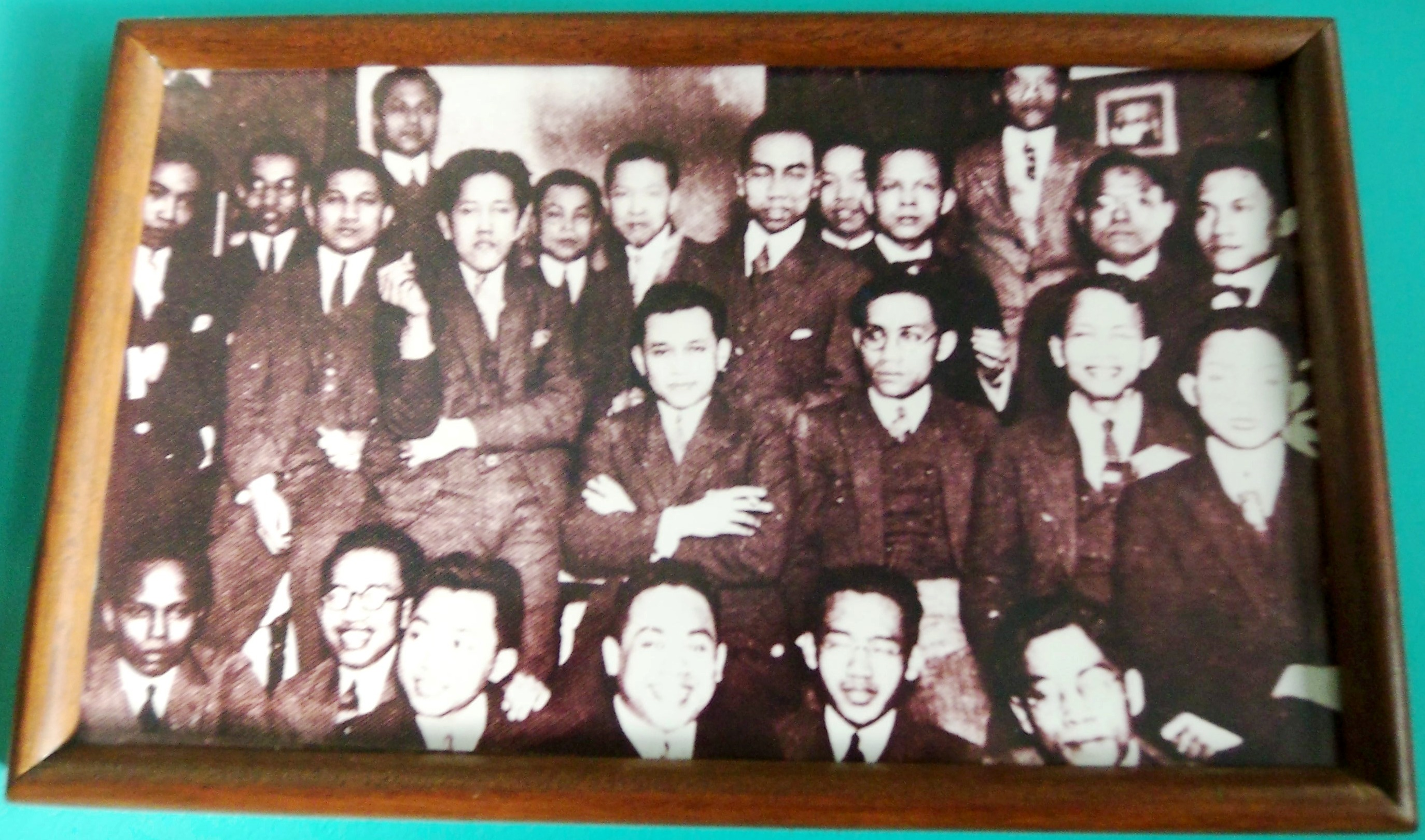
Delegates to the Youth Pledge, where frameworks for independent Indonesia was agreed, most importantly a common national language.

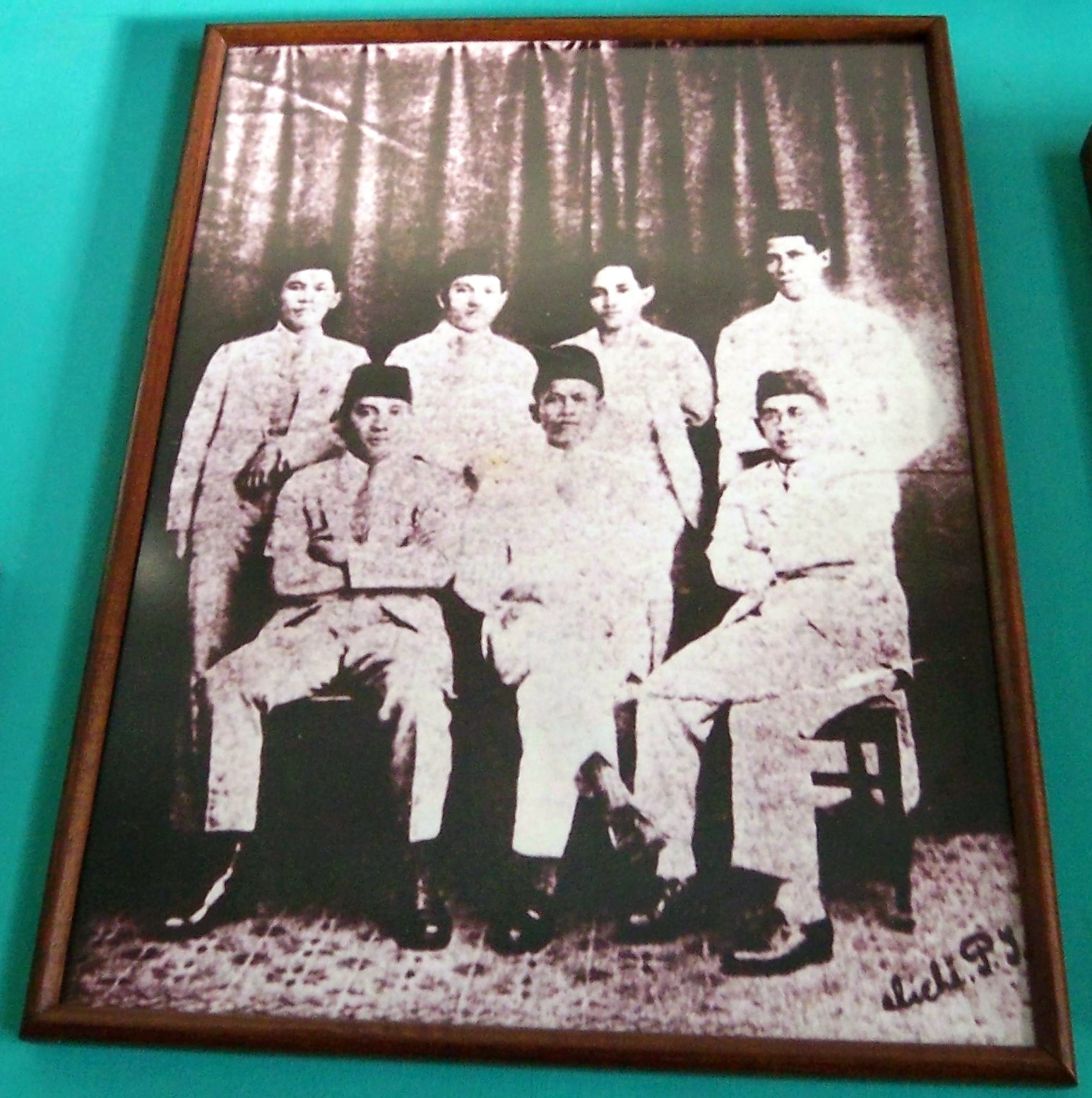
Members of Partai Nasional Indonesia (Indonesian National Party), one of the most prominent pro-Independence organisations.

The Ethical Period's emphasis on education did not deliver widespread educational opportunities, however, it did provide a Dutch education for the children of the indigenous Indonesian elite. Largely intended to provide clerical labour for the growing colonial bureaucracy, the Western education brought with it Western political ideas of freedom and democracy. During the 1920s and 30s, this small elite began to articulate a rising anti-colonialism and a national consciousness.

During this period the first Indonesian political parties began to emerge; the youth group, Budi Utomo was established in 1908, and the Indische Partij in 1912. The same year, Sarekat Islam was founded; inspired more by Islamic and Javanese mysticism than notions of independence and self-rule. It brought Indonesians together, using the banner of Islam in opposition to Dutch rule. In contrast, the Communist Party of Indonesia (PKI), formed in 1920, was a fully-fledged independence party inspired by European politics. In 1926, it attempted a revolution throughout Indonesia through isolated insurrections across Java that panicked the Dutch, who arrested and exiled thousands of communists, effectively neutralising the PKI for the remainder of the Dutch occupation.

Muhammadiyah was established by KH Ahmad Dahlan in Yogyakarta, and Dwijo Sewoyo and some associates formed the Peasant's Insurance Cooperative (Asuransi Jiwa Bersama Bumi Putera) in Magelang.

On 20 July 1913, Suwardi Suryaningrat, who had connections with the Bumi Putera Committee, wrote Als ik eens Nederlander was? (What If I Were a Dutchman?), a striking protest against the plans of the Dutch Colonial Government to celebrate 100 years of Dutch independence. As a result of this article, Dr. Tjipto Mangunkusumo and Suwardi Suryoningrat were tried and sentenced to exile in the Banda Islands. However, they were given the alternative choice of transportation to the Netherlands. In the Netherlands, Suwardi pursued studies in field of Education, while Dr. Tjipto fell ill and returned home to Indonesia.

In 1918 a proto-parliament, the Volksraad, met for the first time, after being established two years before. It consisted of 39 members, where 15 were native Indonesians. During this year, the Dutch government agreed that at some, unspecified point in the future, Indonesians would be granted self-rule, but in subsequent years did nothing to follow up this aim.

In c. 1920 the word "Indonesia" came into its modern usage. Created by an English naturalist George Windsor Earl in 1850 to classify the ethnic and geographic area, "Indonesia" was seized upon by nationalists as a word to imagine a unity of peoples. "Previously the Youth Alliances had talked about a separate Balinese nation, Javanese nation, Sumatran nation, and so on, now 'Indonesia' spoke of a single people".

In 1927, Sukarno founded the Indonesian National Party (PNI) in Bandung. It was the first all-Indonesia secular party devoted primarily to independence.

On 28 October 1928, the All-Indonesian Youth Congress proclaimed the Youth Pledge (Indonesian: Sumpah Pemuda), establishing the nationalist goals of: "one country — Indonesia, one people — Indonesian, and one language — Indonesian".

== Repression of Indonesian nationalism ==
Political freedoms under the Dutch were limited at best. While Dutch aims to "civilize" and "modernize" the peoples of the Indies sometimes led to tolerance for native publications and organisations, the Dutch also strictly limited the content of these activities.

Like many leaders before him, the Dutch government arrested Sukarno in 1929 and placed a virtual ban on PNI. Indeed, the Dutch colonial government repressed many nationalist organisations and jailed a variety of political leaders. Although the Dutch were unable to completely stifle local voices for change, they did successfully thwart widespread agitation. Although nationalist sentiment remained high in the 1930s, real moves towards independence remained stifled. With the dramatic changes of the Second World War, however, political power was recast forever.

== End of the colonial state ==
With the coming of World War II, the political fate of the Indies was suddenly unclear. The islands' Dutch rulers found themselves occupied by Germany in May 1940. Themselves occupied by foreign rulers, the Dutch were in a weak position to guarantee their rule in the Indies. Yet, the colonial government in exile was determined to continue its rule over the archipelago.

In early 1942, Imperial Japan invaded the Dutch East Indies. The Netherlands had little ability to defend its colony against the Japanese army and Dutch forces were overrun in little more than a month—a blow that was to end three and a half centuries of Dutch colonial presence in Indonesia. The changes under the subsequent three-year occupation were so numerous and extraordinary that the subsequent watershed, the Indonesia Revolution, was possible in a manner unfeasible just three years earlier.

After the Japanese surrendered to the Allies in 1945, the Dutch sought to resume colonial control over the Indies. In these aims, the Dutch obtained the military backing of the British who fought numerous battles on Java to restore Dutch rule. The Indonesian nationalists, despite heavy losses, were not to be deterred. By 1945, an idea of "Indonesia" was seemingly irresistible.
