= Budi Utomo =

Political movement in Dutch Indonesia

- Boedi Oetomo
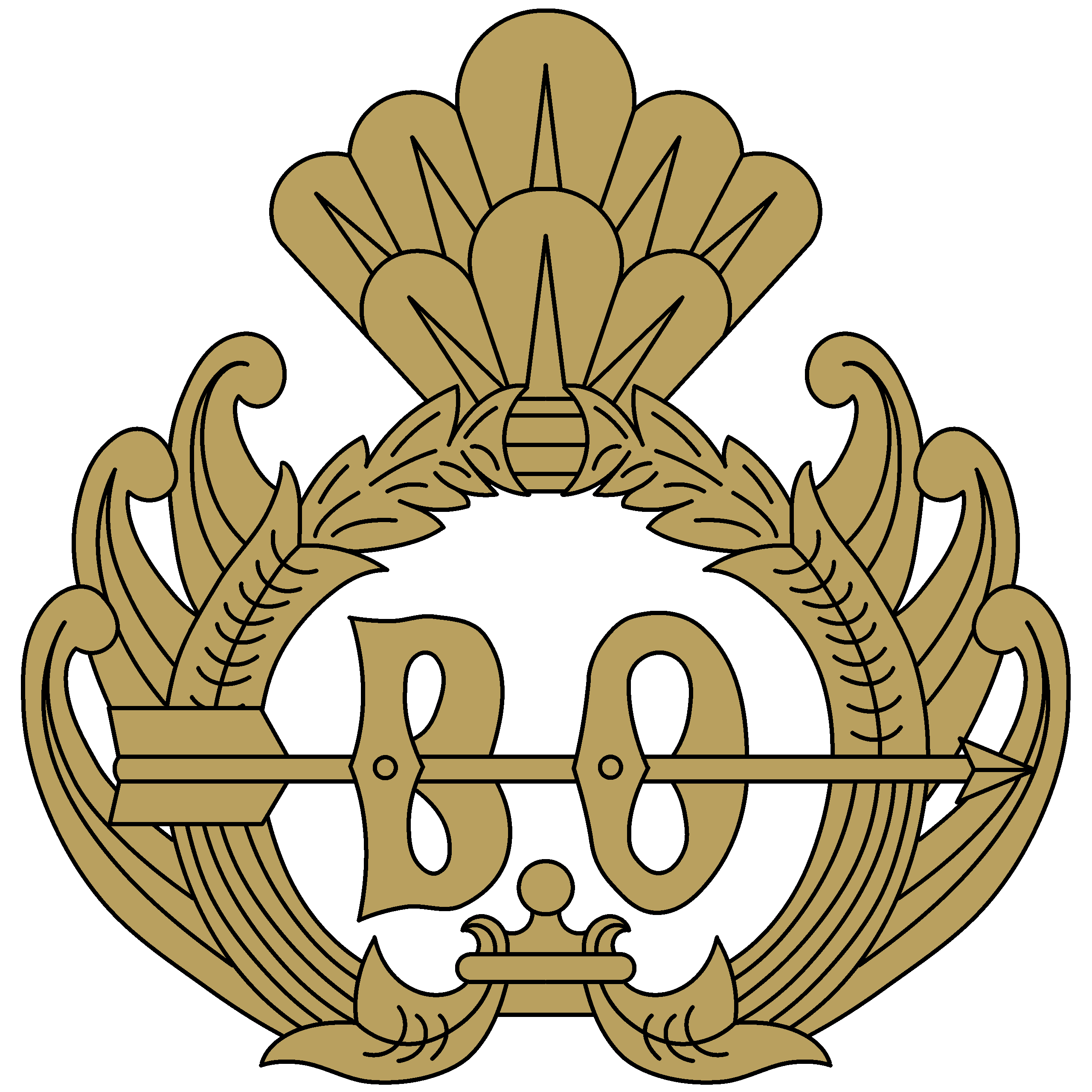
- Abbreviation: B.O.
- Successor: Parindra
- Formation: 20 May 1908
- Dissolved: 25 December 1935
- Type: Nationalist organization
- Members: 10,000 (end 1909)

Budi Utomo (old spelling: Boedi Oetomo, meaning "Noble Endeavour") was an early native nationalist political society in the Dutch East Indies. The organization's founding in 1908 is considered instrumental to the beginning of the Indonesian National Awakening.

== History ==
Budi Utomo is considered the first nationalist society in the Dutch East Indies. The founder of Budi Utomo was Wahidin Soedirohoesodo, a retired government doctor who felt that native intellectuals should improve public welfare through education and culture. The society held its first congress on 20 May 1908, a gathering of students at STOVIA, a medical school in Batavia (present-day Jakarta). The first leader was Soedirohoesodo, but at the organization's first major gathering in Yogyakarta in October 1908, he stepped aside for younger organizers.

The Dutch were tolerant of the rise and development of Indonesian nationalism. Budi Utomo did not have mass appeal, and they regarded the nationalist activities in the first decade of the 20th century as a natural outcome of the Ethical Policy, which emphasised the importance of looking after the welfare of the people.

The membership was an upper-class elite of natives, government officials, and intellectuals, confined very largely to Java and the Javanese. The furtherance of popular education became the main activity. A few branches expanded into native commerce and industry. Tjipto Mangoenkoesoemo, who would later find the more radical Indische Party, expanded the scope of the society to include more working classes and also the rest of the Indïes outside of Java. The organization enjoyed rapid growth; in 1910, the society had 10,000 members enrolled in 40 branches. At the same time, it received official recognition from the colonial government.

Budi Utomo's primary aim was at first not political. However, it gradually shifted toward political aims with representatives in the conservative Volksraad (the People's Council) and the provincial councils in Java. Budi Utomo officially dissolved in 1935. After its dissolution, some members joined the largest political party of the time, the moderate Greater Indonesian Party (Parindra). In keeping with the outlook of Budi Utomo, former members—whether in the Volksraad or Parindra—insisted on using the Indonesian language for all public statements.

The use of Budi Utomo to mark the inception of modern nationalism in Indonesia is not without controversy. Although many scholars agree that Budi Utomo was likely the first modern indigenous political organization, others question its value as an index of Indonesian nationalism. For example, in his novels, Pramoedya Ananta Toer pointed to the exclusively aristocratic and male composition of Budi Utomo. Ariel Heryanto questions the nationalism of Budi Utomo, given that its existence was permitted by the Dutch regime: "Because of [Budi Utomo's] remarkably conservative character, the Dutch colonial administration tolerated [it]." Heryanto points to a "more populist and egalitarian" Muslim association (Sarekat Dagang Islamiyah), born a few years prior, as a more genuinely nationalist organization—one which was banned by the Dutch. Heryanto argues that, in enshrining Budi Utomo as the first nationalist organization, the current government reiterates a colonial version of Indonesian history.

== Legacy ==
The birth of Budi Utomo on 20 May 1908 has been officially commemorated as the National Awakening Day in Indonesia since 1948.

The Museum of National Awakening in Jakarta, dedicated to the Indonesian National Awakening, is housed in a former STOVIA building related to the birth of Budi Utomo. Initially four museums, including a museum to Budi Utomo and a museum to health and medicine, on 7 February 1984, these topical museums were consolidated into the Museum of National Awakening.
