= 1926 communist uprising in Java =

1926 communist revolt in Java
- Western part of Java showing Batavia, Bantam and Preanger Regencies Residencies
Date	November 12, 1926 to December 1926
Location	Java, Dutch East Indies
Result	Government victory

Belligerents
Royal Netherlands East Indies Army (KNIL), Colonial police	Communist Party of Indonesia

The 1926 communist uprising in Java (Indonesian: pemberontakan 1926, lit. '1926 revolt') was an armed revolt against the Dutch colonial government by the Communist Party of Indonesia and its supporters which started on November 12, 1926. It mainly took place in three districts in western Java: Bantam, Batavia, and Preanger Residencies, though there were incidents elsewhere in Java. The revolt was ended almost immediately in Batavia, but continued in rural parts of Bantam and Preanger for several more weeks. It was followed by a similar uprising in Western Sumatra between December 31 and January 2, 1927.

The uprising took place against the advice of the Comintern and parts of the Indonesian Communist Party leadership, and its failure resulted in the crushing of the party and persecution of its members, de facto ban on labour organizing or political freedom in the Indies, and extreme press censorship. The uprisings were put down by the Royal Netherlands East Indies Army and the colonial police, with thousands of arrests and exiles and led to the establishment of the Boven-Digoel concentration camp in early 1927.

== Background ==
=== Political context ===
The 1926 uprising took place in a context of stark racial and economic inequality of post-World War I Dutch East Indies, with increasingly radical demands for independence by Indonesians, labour unrest, and police repression. The Sarekat Islam (SI), the first radical mass organization in the Dutch East Indies, had almost 2 million members in 1919, but its influence was declining in the early 1920s following political splits and the persecution of its leaders. Communists, Islamic traditionalists and reformers, and nationalists had coexisted in that organization during and after World War I, but were increasingly at odds. This led to the founding of the Perserikatan Komunis di Hindia (Communist union of the Indies) in May 1920, which before long had renamed itself the Partai Komunis Indonesia (Indonesian Communist Party, PKI). This new party inherited many of the traits of the SI: radical anti-colonial politics, the use of Islamic identity and themes, the participation of both intellectuals and poor workers and peasants, and an emphasis on labour organizing and mass meetings.

PKI Weltevreden (Sawah Besar) members in 1925

In 1924–5, the PKI was already being severely repressed by the Dutch for its labour radicalism, not to mention for bombings, murder and arson carried out by its members. The prosecutor general of the Indies from 1922–26, D. G. Wolterbeek Muller, was particularly aggressive in targeting communists and other radicals, and expanded press laws to include class hatred as a basis for censorship. Many of the PKI's most organized and disciplined leaders were arrested and exiled under his tenure, including Semaun, Darsono and Tan Malaka. Others, like Musso, Budisutjitro and Sugono fled to Singapore to avoid arrest in early 1925. The colonial Penal Code was also amended in April 1925 to include new articles designed to target radicals; mocking or undermining the colonial order, going on strike or advocating strikes now carried prison sentences of five to six years.

These waves of repression, arrests and exiles left the PKI with a relatively inexperienced leadership which was prone to ultraleftism and was being pushed to ever more radical views by the constant police repression and surveillance. Bakunin, the Russian anarchist, joined Marx as a figure constantly cited in the PKI's newspapers, and regional branches became increasingly independent and politically unorthodox. While this period was chaotic, it was also an outpouring of activity and local organization. Rianne Subijanto notes that "1924 and 1925 were the most radical years of the movement and were mobilized by local members" and were "halcyon days of the early Indonesian communist movement."

=== Planning the uprising ===
The PKI Central Committee met with regional delegates and VSTP leaders (Dutch: Vereniging van Spoor-en Tramwegpersoneel, train workers union) in the town of Prambanan, Sleman Regency, not far from the Prambanan temple compound, on December 25, 1925. According to the PKI's own history published decades later, the executive committee at that conference consisted of chairman Sardjono, Budisutjistro, Sugono, Suprodjo, Kusnogunoko, Najoan, Herujuwono, Winanta, Gondojuwono, Said Ali, Abdul Muntalib and Marco Kartodikromo. They decided that legal agitation had become impossible and that the time had come for a serious insurrection against the Dutch, which was meant to take place in the middle of 1926. The party called regional leaders to its headquarters in January 1926 to prepare them for the coming insurrection, although tactical details remained vague. A secret leadership group called the dubbele organisatie, 'double organization' (DO) was also created to guide the PKI's illegal plans, and local branches were also apparently authorized to create their own illegal DO cells. Meanwhile, the party's former leaders in exile and the Comintern did not support the plan. Comintern had already advised against taking any violent action in May 1925, saying there was no prospect for victory without strong support among the peasants. The planned revolt was also opposed by Tan Malaka, one of the PKI's most articulate leaders who had been in exile since 1922.

Alimin in the 1920s

Alimin, president of the Batavia branch of the PKI, traveled to Manila in early 1926 to convince Malaka to endorse the plan, but he refused. Malaka's view was the same as the official Comintern line: he thought that the party needed to take more time to build itself up through strikes and the development of affiliated mass organizations like the Sarekat Rakjat (people's union), to avoid terrorism, and to continue to develop its links to the international communist movement. Many party members back in Indonesia were influenced by his skepticism, but supporters of the revolt in the party decided to send Alimin and Musso to the USSR to try and make their case to the Comintern.

Semaun, another leading Indonesian communist, was already in the USSR and was in attendance at the Comintern's plenary meeting in early 1926. There, he defended the PKI against charges of Trotskyism or Left Deviations, a relevant issue due to the very current disputes between Stalin and the Left Opposition led by Trotsky. Semaun asserted that the PKI was responding to circumstances beyond its control when it did not follow the Comintern's advice.

Some among the PKI resented the Comintern and the Communist Party of the Netherlands for their paternalistic attitudes which did were not accompanied by material support. These pro-revolt factions in the PKI intended to proceed regardless of the response Alimin and Musso got in Moscow, although they were willing to delay things if an affirmative answer would be accompanied by support from abroad. As historian Ruth McVey described it, at this point "the party's mood was one of blind commitment to rebellion" or as Shelton Stromquist put it, a "rudderless revolution" on a course of "increasing disorder." Historian Takashi Shiraishi puts it even more bluntly, saying that "with most of its leaders either in prison or abroad and facing disintegration, the PKI organized revolts in Java in November 1926 and in Sumatra in January 1927". But elements in the party still recognized its weakness, hence the uneven support for the planned revolt.

Throughout 1926, as it had in 1925, the PKI continued to be persecuted by the Dutch: arrests of leaders such as Darsono and Aliarcham, closure of its offices and newspapers, seizure of its archives, bans on public gatherings, and near-totalitarian police surveillance. The party held a meeting with regional leaders in late June, and only delegates from Batavia, Bantam, Priangan, and South Sumatra declared themselves ready for an insurrection. The party decided to delay the planned revolt by six months and to spend the time preparing and attempting to win over more district party organizations. According to the party's history of this meeting it also elected a revolutionary committee (Comite Pemberontak) chaired by Dahlan, with Sukrawinata as secretary and with Herujuwono, Samudro and Baharudhin Saleh as members, which had its base in Bandung.

During this time Alimin and Musso arrived in the USSR, pleaded their case to Stalin and the Comintern, where they were sent back to the Indies with instructions to reverse course, that the party should attempt to regain legal status and build its strength in a more gradual way. According to McVey, it is unclear if the PKI ever received these directives, or what they thought of them, as Musso and Alimin were arrested by the British in Johore, Malaya on their way back to the Indies.

== Uprising ==
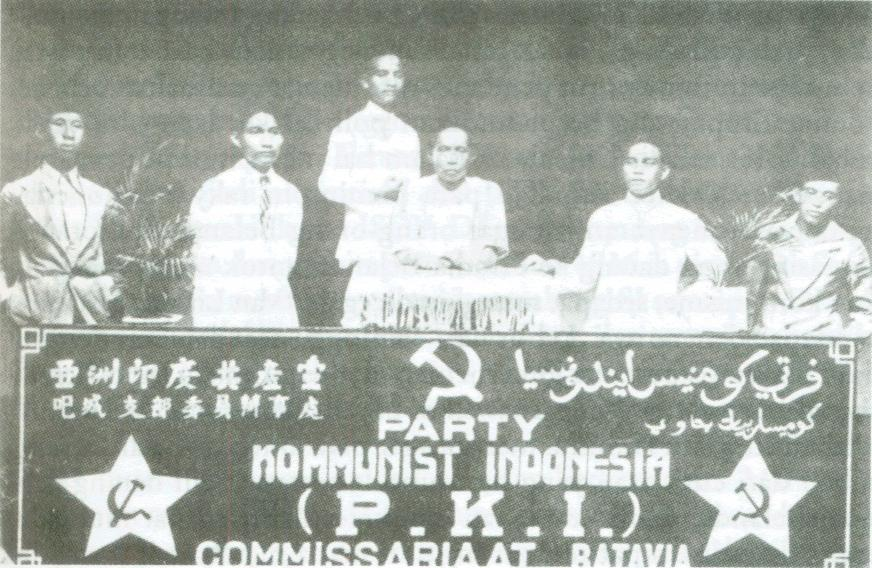
PKI leaders in Batavia, 1925

PKI leaders in the capital Batavia, styling themselves the Comite van de Revolutie, or the Komite Penggalang Republik Indonesia (committee for the support of the Indonesian Republic) were particularly primed for a violent revolt. According to the PKI's own history, that committee included Soekaesih, Sukrawinata, Kamari, and others; these likely directed the actions in Batavia during the rebellion itself. In August and September 1926 the local party launched several bomb attacks, and subsequent raids and rough treatment by the police pushed them closer to staging a larger revolt. They also recruited a number of career criminals to their side.

In late October the Batavia committee set the date of their uprising as November 12, not bothering to involve the PKI Central Committee which had relocated to Bandung in May. Even when the Central Committee were brought up to speed, many had misgivings or second thoughts. On November 7 and 8 they met in Cirebon to spread the plan, made an agreement with the railway workers' union (VSTP) that they would launch a strike at the same time, and sent delegates to obtain confirmation from PKI district organizations around Java and Sumatra. Most districts replied affirmatively, but Surakarta, Jogjakarta, and Madiun said no. The police knew about many aspects of this plan, and arrested party leaders in Pekalongan, Cirebon, Temanggung and Tegal shortly before it was due to begin, preventing uprisings in those and many other districts. But in other cases they were apparently taken by surprise.

Members of the 1926 revolt executive committee

In the end, the rebellion started on the 12th not in major cities in Java with large PKI memberships such as Surabaya and Semarang, but in the districts of Western Java which had already said they were ready in the June meeting: Bantam, Batavia, and Preanger Regencies Residency. Padang in West Sumatra, which had indicated it was also ready, said it would only act with the approval of the PKI Central Committee, and therefore did not take up arms until the end of the year. After the uprising had been happening for a few days, isolated incidents did take place in other cities, such as a series of armed attacks and arsons on official residences in Surakarta on the nights of November 17 to 19. The events were eagerly covered by Dutch and Malay language newspapers in the Indies, in some cases through ANETA wire bulletins or through the paper's own local correspondents.

=== Batavia Residency ===
KNIL soldiers on patrol in Batavia during unrest

PKI gangs armed with machetes and some firearms gathered late in the day on November 12 in districts such as Meester-Cornelis, sometimes growing as large as several hundred people. Their major focus was the neighborhood of Old Batavia and Glodok prison. Armed PKI groups worked their way around the city late into the night, attacking civil authorities where they found them, setting up roadblocks, and killing a few Javanese police officers. KNIL detatchments, including some under local commander Colonel Diemont and Menadonese infantry led by Captain Theo Becking, were sent to the city immediately.

Late at night, a telephone exchange was seized, and a failed attempt was made on the office of the Aneta news agency. They lost control of the telephone exchange after a few hours, and escaped into the sewers. About sixty men attacked the Glodok prison close to midnight, and may have freed some prisoners, but the were eventually overpowered by a KNIL brigade led by Diemont. By the morning of the 13th, authorities had taken back control of Batavia, put many public buildings under military guard, and arrested hundreds of people. After then most disturbances were isolated acts with small groups of gunmen or clashes with PKI members who were fleeing the city.

=== Bantam Residency ===
KNIL soldiers led by Van de Vinne in operation in Banten

Bantam Residency, equivalent to Banten province today, was one of the poorest parts of Java, where the Dutch later estimated there were 4 thousand card-carrying PKI members and many more fellow travelers, including among clerics and peasants. Among the party's notables in the area was Tubagus Alipan, a printer and PKI member who had moved back to the area in 1925 at Darsono's request, and Puradisastra, Soekaesih's brother, who was a PKI journalist who was not from Banten but had married a Bantenese woman. They and other local activists had helped establish a PKI branch in Banten in September 1925. They had also become the core local planning group for the uprising and had fundraised among local members to buy arms during 1926, alongside radical members of the local Ulama, such as Hadji Achmad Chatib, who was arrested in late October. Despite their first round of arrests, Dutch police knew much less about the plans in Bantam and were not as prepared to stop them. They had confiscated arms and made some arrests in September, and were convinced that would be the end of it.

As in Batavia, armed groups gathered in cities and towns on the evening of the 12th. Their plan was to arrest all Europeans and officials in the district and kill those who resisted, and then wait for instructions from PKI Batavia. By the next day, a number of native officials and police officers had been killed, including the district head of Menes and the assistant head and several police officers in Cening, both in Pandeglang Regency. The railway supervisor in Menes, the only European in town, was taken into custody; he was later killed. In Tangerang, the Residency's largest city, a group as large as 400 marched in the city on evening of the 12th and cut off telephone communication. In Labuan, a port town on the Sunda Strait, an armed group several hundred strong attacked the district head's house after midnight on the 12th, taking him into custody and killing a policeman in the process.

KNIL soldiers near Labuan with communist prisoners

The rebels failed to cut telephone lines from Labuan and Menes, which worked against them as an alarm was sent out to the Resident after midnight and then to authorities in Batavia. As in Batavia, KNIL brigades led by captain Becking were sent to Tangerang and outlying districts to support the troops already stationed in the area; they arrived on the afternoon of the 13th, and faced difficulties due to blocked rail lines and ambushes. By the 13th, many residents, including much of the Chinese Indonesian population, had fled towns such as Labuan to avoid being caught in the fighting.

The revolt spread quickly to the countryside and took on a religious character among peasants who were mainly armed only with knives. Many of these peasants had been primed for months with rumours that, on the day of the revolt, all Dutch in the district would be killed, or the Soviet fleet would arrive in the bay, and so on. Labuan became a focal point of the uprising, as on the 14th rebels from other villages congregated there. Captain Becking's brigades continued to be involved; by the 15th bloody shootouts continued to take place with deaths on both sides, but especially on the Indonesian side as a group of 500 with only a few guns met Becking's well armed brigade by chance. Again, the troops were hampered by cut telephone lines and a destroyed bridge. By this time things had calmed down in Rangkasbitung, Menes, Serang, and other parts of the Residency, with KNIL having set up fortified posts. Two more brigades of KNIL troops arrived on the 16th, and by the 18th, most parts of the Residency had been pacified, although isolated fighting and sabotage continued until December. For example, on December 4 and 5 attacks were made on the house of an official in Cening, in Padeglang district. Many villagers laid down their arms and may not have been arrested by the Dutch if they were not named by other prisoners.

=== Preanger Regencies Residency ===
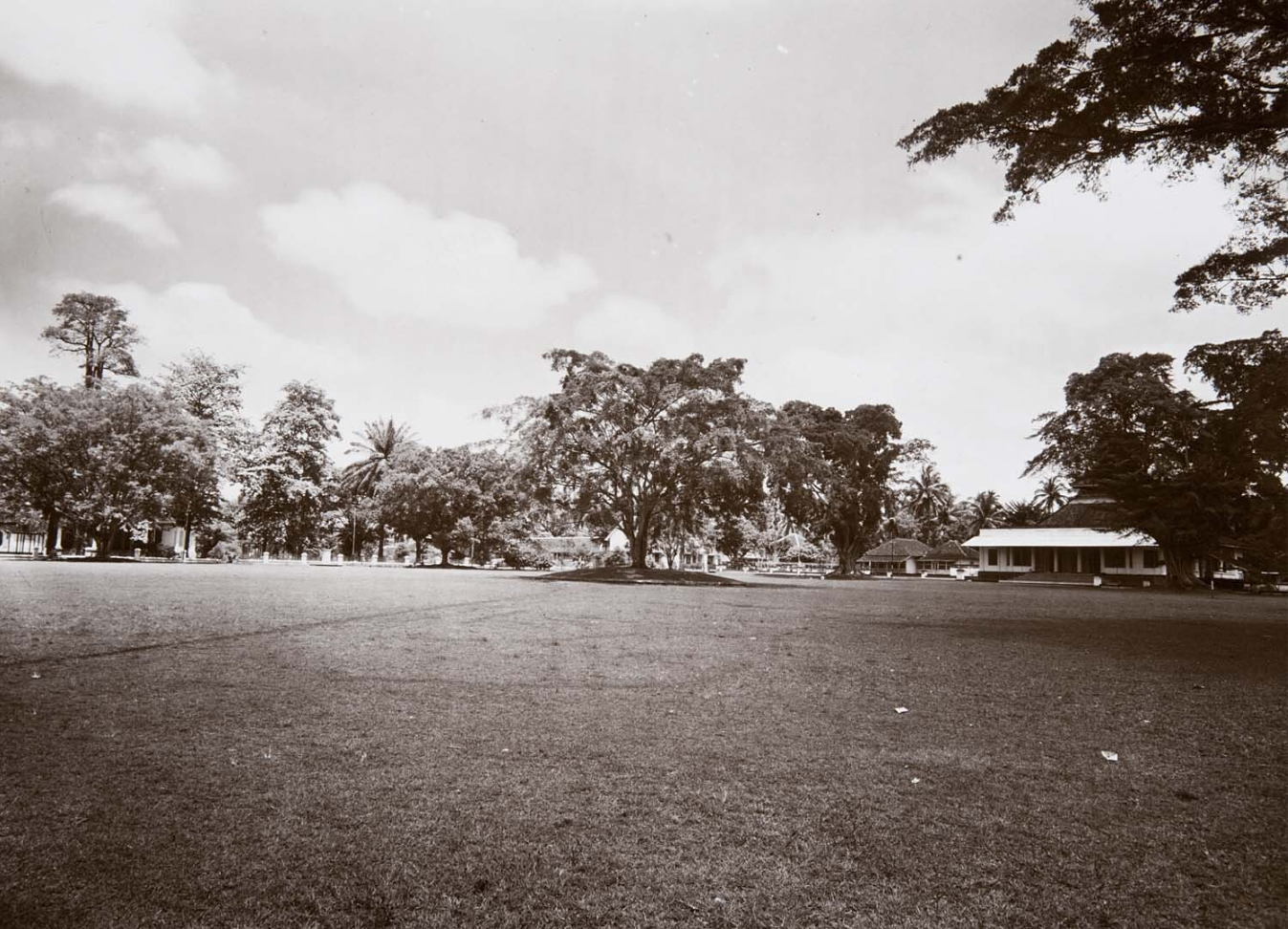
Town square in Ciamis, Preanger Regencies Residency, c.1925–1933

In Preanger (today Parahyangan), PKI groups cut off communication lines and attacked police and local officials starting on the 12th. Initial reports from Rancaekek noted that a village head had been killed and that telephone and railway lines had been cut off, while in Nagreg, a village near Bandung, four native police officers were killed. In Ciamis, an armed attack on the telephone station led to a shootout with local police where the local Chinese ward master (Dutch: wijkmeester) was killed. Even with the station retaken, telephone and telegraph wires were cut again on the 14th and took several days to restore. In Bandung, police arrested the entire central PKI leadership on the 13th, including the chairman Sardjono and a dozen others. 50 soldiers were sent to Garut, Tasikmalaya and Ciamis on the 14th; some of these continued to be targeted, as in the case of a patrol in Ciamis where a soldier was wounded. As in Bantam, isolated fighting continued into December.

== Aftermath ==
=== Arrests and exile ===
Because of the disorganization and relative weakness of the PKI, their uprising was quickly put down and in many places never had a chance to begin. In the first few days, counterattacks and arrests of PKI rebels were directed by Dutch Residents in the districts they governed, sending troops and police over to other Residencies as needed. There was an emergency meeting of the Council of the Dutch East Indies on the 13th, where Governor General Andries Cornelis Dirk de Graeff insisted that a large number of communist leaders should be arrested as soon as possible. He saw the widespread revolt as a failure of the political police and the intelligence apparatus. The speaker of the Volksraad assured the public that order and public safety would be restored. However, it took time for the intended mass arrests to be organized. During the first few days, PKI members and trade unionists continued to be preventatively arrested in other cities in Java which had seen no violence. Military patrols were also made in many of these other cities in Java as a show of force despite the lack of unrest.

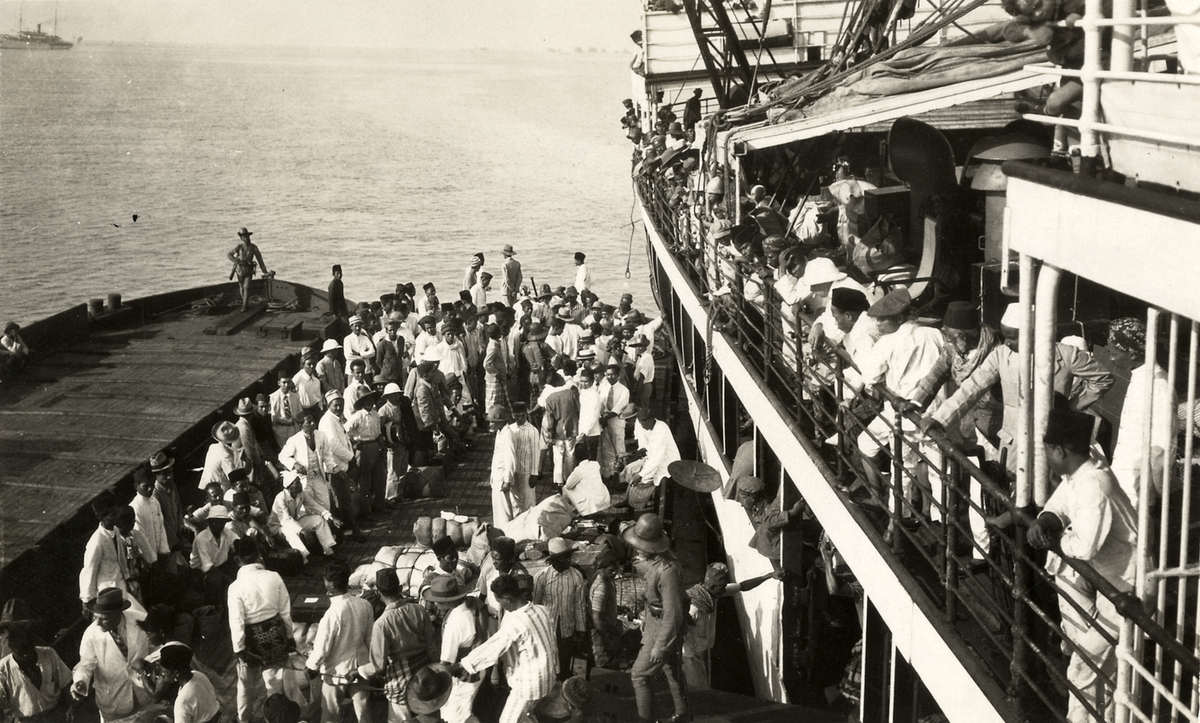
Indonesian communist prisoners being exiled to Boven-Digoel concentration camp, 1927

By November 17, the Attorney General finally ordered more systematic mass arrests. This required the rapid expansion of the colonial police force. Roughly 4,500 were accused of participating directly in the uprising and were imprisoned, with a handful sentenced to death. Another 8,500 who had not committed any specific crime also came under scrutiny, and in many cases were also detained, bringing the total to 13,000. These were low-level Communist party members, journalists, and other associates who had no provable involvement in the events. Out of this 8,500, around a thousand were identified as troublesome, and roughly 6,700 were released after questioning. Despite the mass arrests, isolated acts of arson and sabotage continued into December around Java, with the armed uprising in West Sumatra starting only at the end of that month.

With thousands of Indonesians in custody, De Graeff thought that a formal trial would give them a platform to spread their message, and decided that they should be exiled, ideally all to the same place. By early December, a site in an isolated part of Papua was identified as an ideal place for the mass exile. This location was 450 kilometres up the Digul river and was a barren, sparsely populated area with endemic Malaria. Soldiers and convict labourers started work in January 1927 and built the first part of the Boven-Digoel concentration camp: a dock on the river, barracks, a hospital, a radio station and post office, and other infrastructure. The first group of fifty internees arrived in March, accompanied by thirty family members. Many more continued to be sent, and by April 1930 the camp was at its largest, with 1,308 internees and around 700 family members.

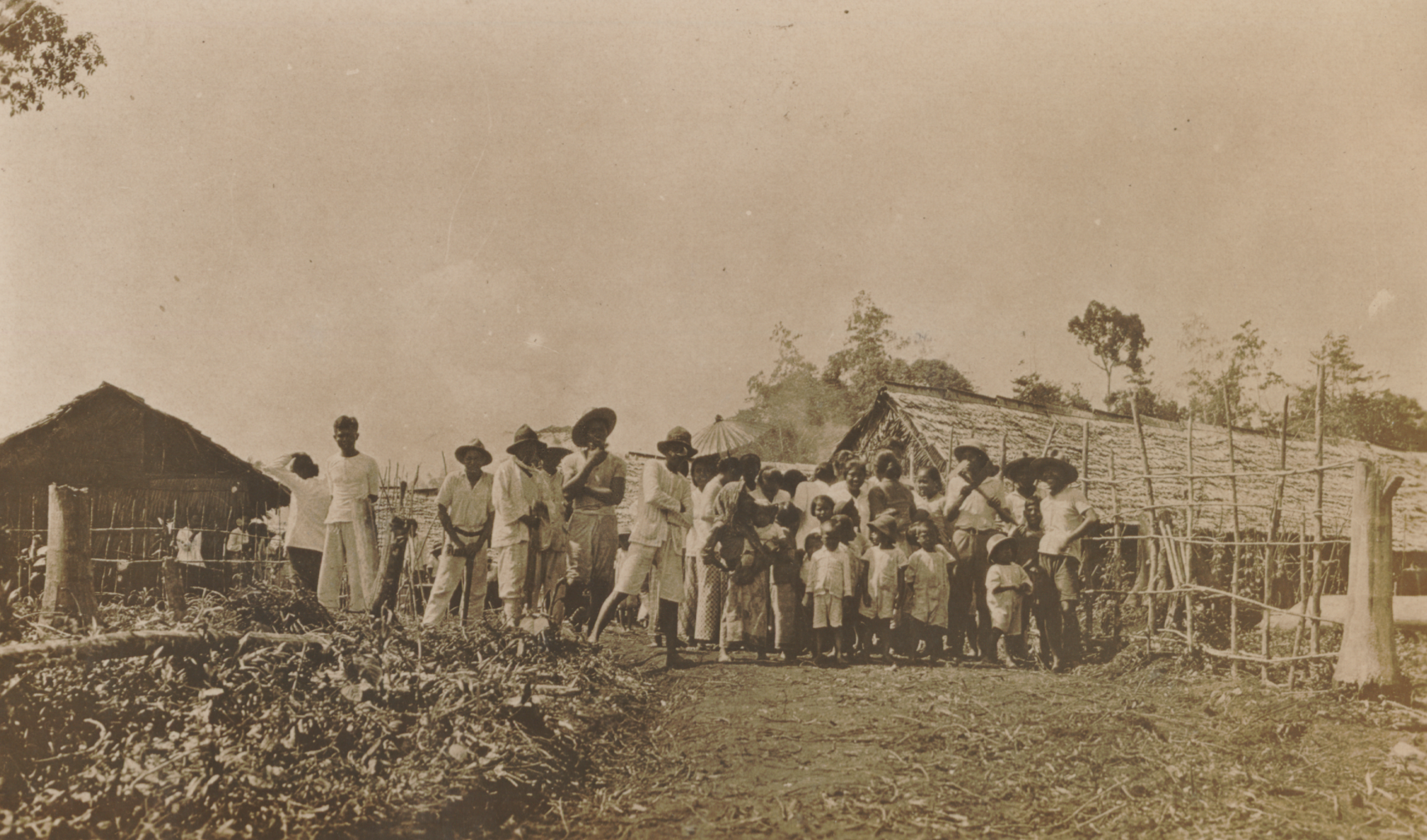
Internees in the Boven Digoel concentration camp, 1927.

=== Shift in government policy ===
According to McVey, after the 1926–27 rebellions, the Dutch lost any interest in trying to placate or compromise with Indonesian nationalists—meaning not only communists but anyone opposing the colonial order. This meant the end of the so-called Ethical Policy, a paternalistic form of colonialism with some adherents in recent decades, to which even Governor General de Graeff subscribed; after the rebellion, he saw not only communists but also Indonesian nationalists as needing to be ruthlessly put down. For Indonesians, politics became an elite affair, exercised very cautiously. As Merle Ricklefs put it,

With PKI’s destruction two other things came to an end for the duration of the colonial period. Not until the Second World War did the rural masses again play such an active role in political agitation. And never again did the Dutch tolerate radical anticolonial movements for more than brief periods. Conservative views among the Dutch colonialists now went largely unchallenged.

Takashi Shiraishi agrees, stating that "the revolts had a decisive effect on the debate over the colonial strategy and tilted the balance in favor of conservatives."

Soekamiskin prison near Bandung, opened in 1930

The Dutch also came to view any labour organizing or strikes as communist agitation, regardless of any real grievances of workers, because many union leaders had been PKI-affiliated before 1926. This was true not only in urban settings, but on sugar plantations where the PKI had led campaigns prior to its destruction. And many trade union leaders were already imprisoned after the uprising, making the task of rebuilding in a hostile climate even more difficult. Press freedom and freedom of speech, which had already been quite limited, were further curbed with new regulations. A new Press Curbing Ordinance (Persbreidelordonnatie) was passed in September 1931 which gave the Governor General extreme powers to detain, blacklist, censor or imprison news editors. The basis for censorship was extended from defamation and other to include subversion and incitement.

=== International reactions ===
The British, who had tolerated PKI members living and organizing in Singapore, started sharing intelligence with the Dutch after these uprisings.

The Communist Party of the Netherlands portrayed the rebellion as having been provoked by the government to crush its opposition, and urged leniency for those arrested. The Comintern, on the other hand, changed its line and put out a statement in support of the rebellion in Java on November 20. For several months it continued to put out statements in support of a revolution in Java, but these ended by mid-1927 as it had become clear the uprising was finished. The Comintern then decreed that the PKI should regain its legal status and rebuild itself, but that was made impossible by Dutch policy. At the end of 1927 it issued a more thorough report that said that the uprising had been highly important but had made strategic errors, most importantly the lack of a broad front and mobilized peasantry.

== Assessment ==
=== By Indonesian communists and Sukarno ===
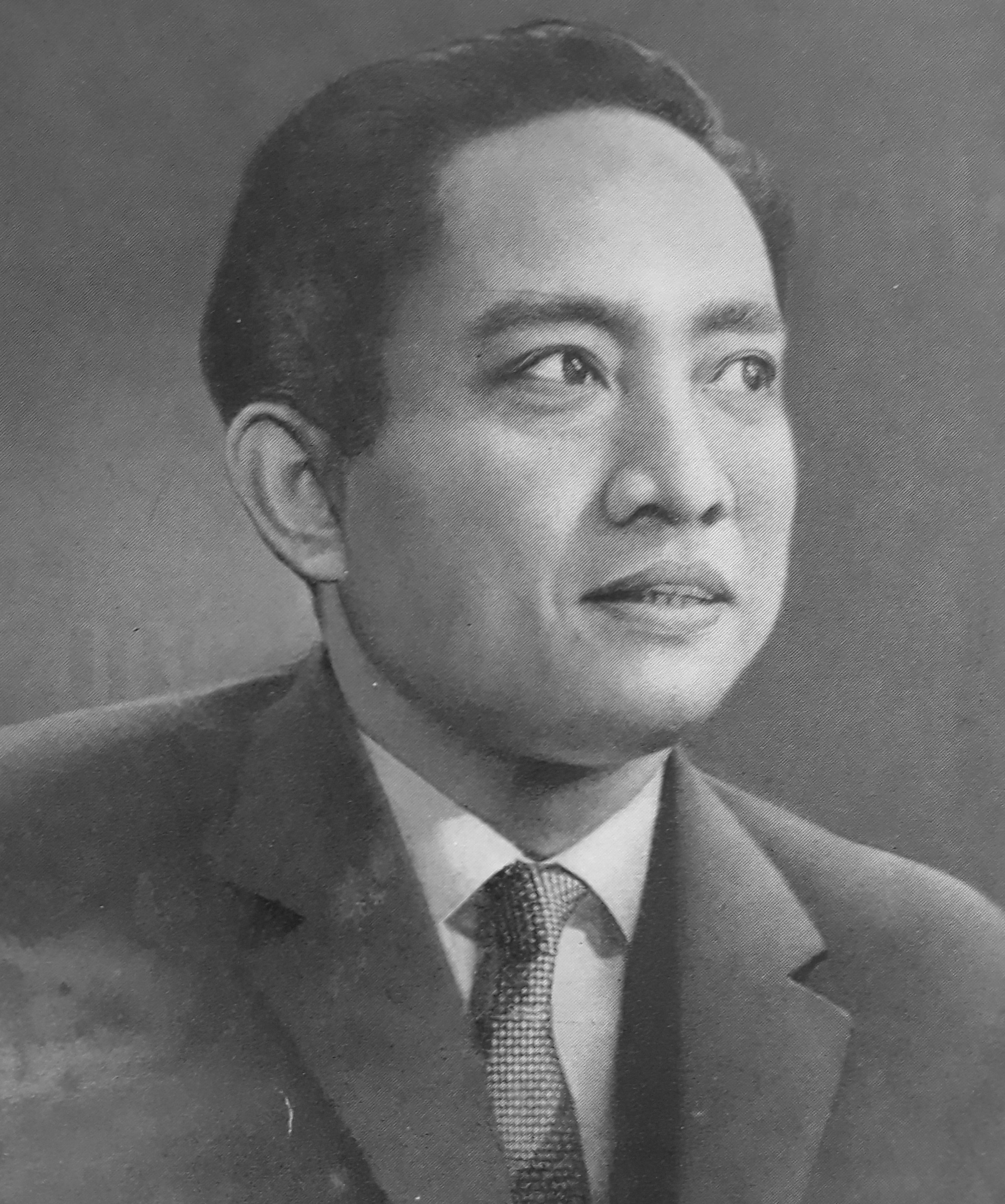
Portrait of D. N. Aidit in 1963

Among the PKI leaders who were abroad during the 1926 crackdown, some survived in the USSR or elsewhere and returned to Indonesia during the war for independence against the Dutch after 1945, including Musso, Sardjono and Alimin. Alimin in particular was still tainted by his association with the failed 1926 uprising. Nonetheless, the uprisings became an important part of the mythology of the PKI after it became a legal party again upon Indonesian independence in the late 1940s.

Aidit, leader and key intellectual of the party in that era, portrayed it in nationalist-revolutionary terms; in 1964 he called the uprising a stage in the "national revolutionary struggle of the Indonesian people" which he viewed as having started in 1908. With regards to the PKI's own history, he saw it as the end of its first phase (1920–26), with the second phase only beginning with the reemergence of the party in secret in 1935. The PKI published educational materials about the uprisings, including Pemberontakan Nasional Pertama di Indonesia (1926) (First national uprising in Indonesia, 1926) in 1961. The party's 40th anniversary book, which draws heavily on Aidit's earlier writings, employs European terminology to describe the revolts as the point of transition between the "first white terror, 1920–26" and the "underground struggle and anti-fascist front, 1926–45." Government histories produced during the same time period, while the PKI was still legal and influential, also describe it as a first national uprising alongside other nationalist movements and organizations of the 1920s. This is similar to how Sukarno himself portrayed it; in his writings he often said that his Indonesian National Party picked up where the PKI left off in 1926, carrying on their struggle.

=== By the Dutch ===
The 1926–7 rebellions, short lived as they were, pushed the Dutch into an era of political repression which lasted until the Japanese invasion of the Dutch East Indies in 1942. They held two commissions of inquiries into the reason for the 1926–27 communist rebellions which were very thorough in investigating the precursors and events of the uprisings. However, McVey called these reports "limited in both their objectives and their point of view" while Stromquist wrote that "their overriding bias has done more to cloud than to clarify the meaning of this particular historical event" and that they "place the uprisings in a framework of analysis which would not challenge the basic assumptions of Dutch colonial rule." Thorough independent analyses were also published, such as J. Th. Petrus Bloemberger's De Communistische Beweging in Nederlandsch-Indië (1928).

=== English-language historians ===
Serious English-language historical works about the 1926–7 uprisings emerged in the 1960s with the expansion of Area studies support in the United States and in particular Cornell University's Modern Indonesia Project. Notable early English-language works that covered it in detail are Ruth McVey and Harry Benda's The Communist Uprisings of 1926-1927 in Indonesia: Key Documents (1960), which translated Dutch reports into English for the first time; and McVey's The Rise of Indonesian Communism (1965), and Justus M. van der Kroef's The Communist Party of Indonesia (1965). Justus van der Kroef wrote in an earlier work in 1963 that

the party had, however, been able to capitalize somewhat on the growing political consciousness of the Indonesia population since the First World War and on their rising expectations for a totally new life under the aegis of developing political ideologies, but the PKI's inability to coordinate these new currents into an effective political organization freedoomed the rebellion. [...] The party went into a steep decline from which it would not recover until nearly two decades later. The ignominious end of the insurrection showed that in the last analysis the most formidable obstacle to the party's growth was the Dutch colonial government and its police authority.

McVey's view was that

all mass political activity seemed to have been brought to an end by the defeat of the revolt. The Communist debacle seemed to have finished popular hope that anything was to be achieved by political action, revolutionary or otherwise; and the Indonesian masses retired from the stage, not to return until Japan's victory over the Dutch proved once and for all that the white ruler was not invincible.

Sheldon Stromquist, writing in 1967, said

the uprisings were in a real sense nationalist in their outlook and content. Their leaders were members of a small educated minority, their goals included a nation-state free to determine its own will. The uprisings were rooted less in rising hopes than in the continuing degradation of life under Dutch rule. [...] the uprisings were the beginning of another era, that of active, revolutionary resistance, not only in Indonesia, but in much of the colonial world.

=== Indonesian historians ===
As opposed to the sympathetic portrayals in government-funded histories before the Transition to the New Order, after 1966 government-friendly Indonesian historians tended to downplay or ignore the revolts. They were conflicted on the due to being officially anticommunist, but also required to portray anticolonial movements of the past as heroic. In many cases, in official textbooks, PKI's role in Indonesian history starts with the Madiun Affair in 1948, where it is portrayed as having stabbed the republic in the back. Even when they do appear earlier, as in the work of Nugroho Notosusanto, the PKI's early role is either ignored or portrayed as opportunism on behalf of foreign communists. In Notosutanto's earlier work before the fall of Sukarno, working with the army's history division, he ignores the PKI's early history. By the height of his career in the 1980s, along with his co-author Marwati Djoened Poesponegoro, he writes in a national history book published by the department of education:

PKI leaders sacrificed thousands of their followers and thousands ot patriots, individuals who were not affiliated with the party but had been incited to join the revolt. [...] It is difficult to regard the '1926 Uprising' as an event to be celebrated in the context of Indonesia’s national history.

According to their logic, because the PKI were only parasites on a spontaneous radical movement, they played no real role in anti-colonial history; he portrays their fleeing the country as an act of cowardice. However, other books published by the regime do accept the PKI's role, such as a 1990 book about the anticolonial struggle in West Java which draws heavily on early Dutch publications and the work of McVey and Benda.

After the fall of the New Order in 1998 and the ending of censorship in the early 2000s, there was renewed interest in the history of the PKI and older works were republished, although works such as Notosutanto and Poesponegoro's national history continued to be published in new editions as well.
