= Aliarcham =

Indonesian communist politician

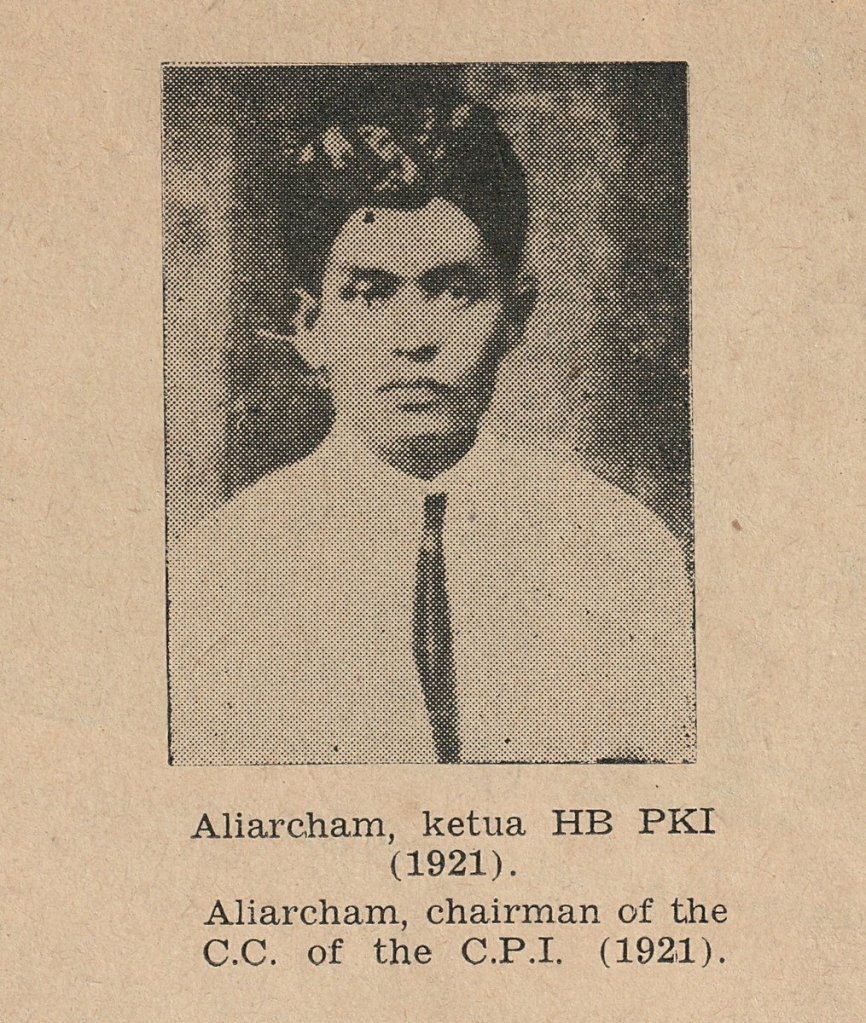
Aliarcham, Indonesian communist, early 1930s

Aliarcham (c.1901-1933) was a Sarekat Islam and Indonesian Communist Party party leader, activist and theoretician in the Dutch East Indies. He was a major figure behind the PKI's turn to more radical policies in the mid-1920s. He was arrested by Dutch authorities in 1925 and exiled to the Boven-Digoel concentration camp, where he died in 1933. He became a well-known Martyr, especially among Communists and Indonesian nationalists.

== Biography ==
=== Early life ===
Aliarcham was born in 1901 or 1902 in Asemlegi, Juwana district, Pati Regency, Dutch East Indies. He was the son of a school principal in Madiun. He studied in a Pesantren (traditional Islamic school), then at a Hollands Inlandse School (Dutch language primary schooling) and a teacher's school (Kweekschool voor Inlands Onderwijs) in Ungaran. In his youth he was influenced by the ideals of Saminism, a radical ideology popular in the Indies at that time, and by the time he was a young man he was reading radical newspapers such as Sinar Hindia and Het Vrije Woord.

=== Political activities ===
In the late 1910s he started to meet many of the intellectuals who wrote for those papers and who were active in radial organizations, such as Semaun and Henk Sneevliet, and joined the Sarekat Islam. In 1921 he joined the Indonesian Communist Party (PKI). He continued to be involved in the Semarang branch of the Sarekat Islam, and became its chairman in 1923. In 1922 he was expelled from his teaching job at a school in Purworejo Regency, possibly because he had organized a Sarekat Rakjat group among his students. He dedicated himself more completely to the Communist Party's activities, and became head teacher at a PKI school in Semarang after the former head (Tan Malaka) was deported. In October 1923, after giving a speech in Semarang, he was arrested on the charge of insulting the civil service; he was sentenced to 4 months in jail in April 1924. The speech was probably just a pretext, as a number of other Semarang PKI leaders were arrested at around the same time, including Boedisotjitro and Partondo, editor in chief of Sinar Hindia. After his release, in the summer of that year he was made PKI commissioner for Batavia alongside Alimin, leader of the party's standing committee and may have also been acting party chairman for a time. However, his time in power was also a time of disarray for the party, as Semaoen had been deported and the party's standing committee was having trouble directing local branches. He also became co-editor of one of the party's newspapers, Ngala, along with Darsono and Gondhojoewono.

At a special congress of the PKI Yogyakarta in December 1924, Aliarcham pushed for radical action, suggesting that the party should abolish its Sarekat Rakjat affiliate groups and reorganize into ten-person PKI cells who would be able to act independently. He was opposed to the PKI continuing to be so moderate and willing to compromise. In the coming months the party did attempt to follow his proposal, hoping to rapidly grow the size of the party in 1925 by adding small local clandestine cells dedicated to radical action and armed struggle. During the first half of 1925 Aliarcham was in jail and had to step down from his PKI leadership posts, because he had broken the colony's strict press censorship laws.

=== Arrest and internment ===
In late 1925, there were a number of strikes in East Java in various trades including metalworking, printing, and ice manufacturing. Aliarcham held leadership positions in some of these strikes, including as chairman of the union of sugar cultivators (Sarekat Boeroeh Goela or Inlandschen Suikerbond), and was living in Surabaya at that time. Aliarcham was arrested in Surakarta in late November 1925 as one of the ringleaders of those strikes under an extralegal method called exorbitante rechten. A number of other high-ranking PKI figures were also caught up in that round of arrests, including Darsono and Mardjoan, leader of the dockworkers union and other PKI-affiliated groups. The arrests prompted official complaints from Communist members of Dutch parliament, including Louis de Visser, but deportations, exile and internment were a well-established technique and the government did not back down. The government also made it illegal for the PKI or their affiliated trade unions to gather. Three weeks after his arrest, without any trial, the government decided exile him to the eastern part of the Indies, first to Merauke, Merauke Regency and eventually to the Boven-Digoel concentration camp in (now located in Papua). His colleagues in Semarang were horrified by his extralegal internment and started a fundraising committee for him and for Tjoa Tiang Leng, who had also been imprisoned.

Aliarcham and fellow exile Madjoan arrived in Merauke on January 10. At that time the exiled Surakarta communist Haji Misbach was also in Merauke but the two were forbidden to meet. Political prisoners were generally not kept in Merauke for long out of fear they would interact with locals or with sailors at the port; Aliarcham, Darsono and Mardjoan were soon ordered to be sent to Okaba instead. Aliarcham would remain in Okaba for more than a year. During that time, his wife and son came to live with him there, and would subsequently follow him to wherever else he was sent, until 1929 when she became pregnant with their second child. After Okaba, in the fall of 1927, Aliarcham was sent to the Tanahmerah camp (Boven-Digoel), where many of the PKI members implicated in the failed 1926 uprising in Banten had been sent. The prisoners there organized themselves into Kampung councils which sent delegates to the Centrale Raad Digoel, which negotiated with camp authorities for better treatment; Aliarcham was a "delegate", as were many of the other PKI leaders interned there. That organized resistance got Aliarcham and others deported to a new camp after a few months, at Tanahtinggi, about six hours by boat from Tanahmerah. That more remote camp was reserved for "irreconcilable" communist prisoners who would not act deferential to the authorities or accept paid work as "functionaries" or regular labourers. Conditions were very poor there, with Malaria and other diseases rampant among the prisoners.

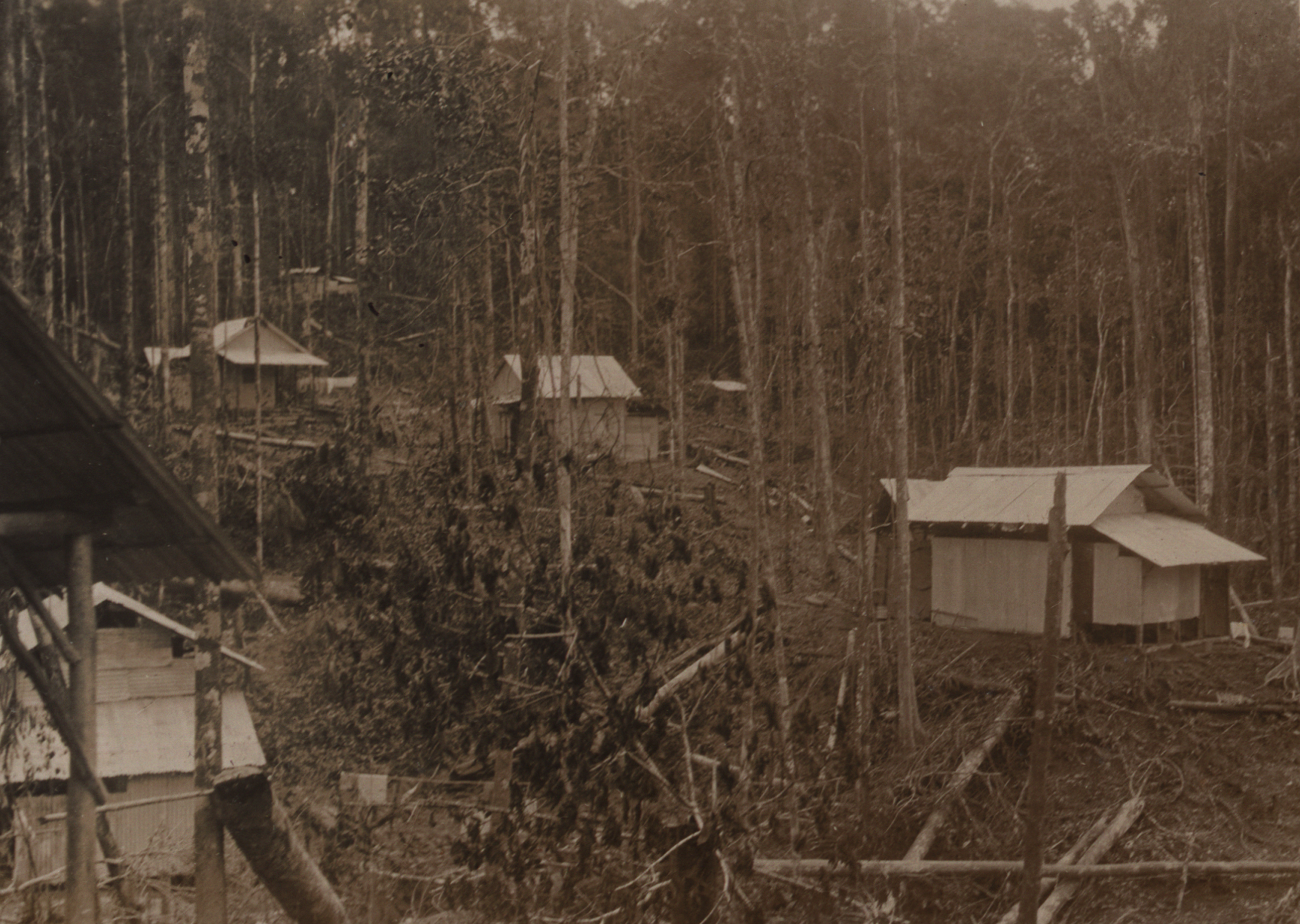
View of internees' barracks at the Tanahtinggi site, Boven-Digoel concentration camp, circa 1929

Aliarcham lived there for the remainder of his exile. He became one of the key figures in the Tanahtinggi camp. He was eventually joined there by a number of former Semarang PKI figures aside from Mardjoan who had been exiled with him; people such as Kadarisman, Soekendar and Mohamed Ali. In December 1928, Henk Sneevliet, Dutch Communist and founding member of the PKI, tried to wire a "Christmas present" of 480 guilders to Aliarcham and Gondhojoewono on behalf of the National Labor Secretariat. The wire transfer was blocked by the Governor General of the Indies. It may have been a stunt by Sneevliet to demonstrate the unfairness of the situation of the detainees; although legally people were allowed to send them books and personal items, most were turned away.

After years in Tanahtinggi, Aliarcham got Tuberculosis and sometimes traveled for examination in Tanahmerah, although he refused treatment. He finally died of his illness on his way back to Tanahmerah, on July 1, 1933. His death was taken very seriously by the other prisoners who held a funeral procession which united various feuding political factions. Photos of his body, funeral and tomb were smuggled out of the camp and were widely reproduced in the Indies. The photo of his grave site, with a wood and tin structure built over it and with a poem by Henriette Roland Holst inscribed on it, was in particular widely reproduced. A number of other high ranking PKI members also died in that camp, including Mas Marco; their graves were kept well-maintained until the camp finally closed in the 1940s.

== Legacy ==
After his death, a core group of roughly twenty-five Tanahtinggi internees remained loyal followers of Aliarcham. They remained as such and continued to live there until the Japanese invasion of the Dutch East Indies when they were evacuated to Australia. I. F. M. Salim, the brother of Agus Salim who had been a Communist in the 1920s, had lived with Aliarcham in Surabaya, and was a detainee at Boven-Digoel until 1943, published a memoir about it in 1973: Fifteen Years in Boven Digoel (Dutch: Vijftien jaar Boven-Digoel: concentratiekamp in Nieuw-Guinea). It came out in Indonesian translation in 1977. He converted to Catholicism during his internment and was not among that group of Aliarcham followers.

In 1959, the PKI named their new theoretical school in Jakarta after Aliarcham: the Akademi Aliarcham or Aliarcham Academy of Social Sciences. It operated until 1965 when it was closed during the Transition to the New Order.
