= Indies Social Democratic Association =

Indonesian political party

Indische Sociaal-Democratische Vereeniging Perhimpunan Demokrat Sosial Hindia
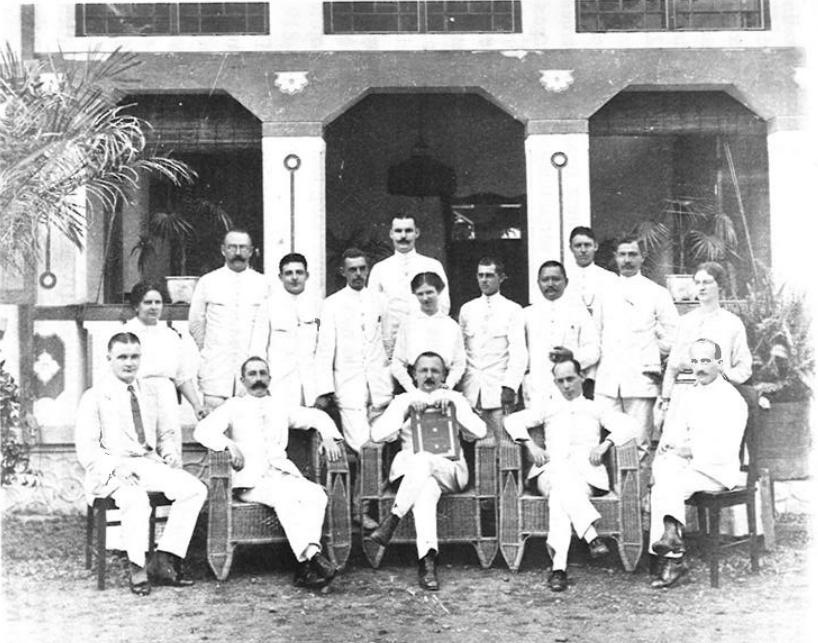
- Leader: Henk Sneevliet
- Founder: Henk Sneevliet; Adolf Baars; C. Hartogh; H. W. Dekker; Bernard Cooster
- Founded: 9 May 1914
- Dissolved: 23 May 1920
- Succeeded by: Perserikatan Kommunist Hindia
- Headquarters: Surabaya; later Semarang
- Newspaper: Het Vrije Woord
- Ideology: Socialism; Marxism; Communism; Anti-imperialism; Proletarian internationalism
- Colors: Red

The Indies Social Democratic Association (ISDV; Dutch: Indische Sociaal Democratische Vereeniging; Indonesian: Perhimpunan Demokrat Sosial Hindia) was the first Marxist political organisation established in the Dutch East Indies. It was founded in Surabaya on 9 May 1914 by Henk Sneevliet and other socialist figures. The ISDV became the forerunner of the Communist Party of Indonesia, which was established in 1920.

== Founding ==
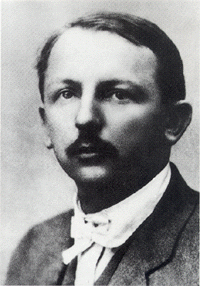
Henk Sneevliet

Henk Sneevliet was a Dutch socialist figure who arrived in the Dutch East Indies in 1913. In the Indies, he joined the railway workers' union Vereniging van Spoor en Tramweg Personeel (VSTP). In early 1914, Sneevliet visited Surabaya, which had already become a gathering place for socialist figures such as L. D. J. Reeser, who eleven years earlier had founded a socialist organisation called the Kontributie Vereeniging. Other socialists, including Bernard Cooster and Coos Hartogh, were also active in Surabaya.

At the time, socialists disagreed over whether a separate socialist organisation should be established in the Dutch East Indies, or if the time was not right. The group, led by Sneevliet, eventually decided to establish the first Marxist socialist organisation in the Dutch East Indies. On 9 May 1914, Sneevliet and sixty other Social Democrats founded the Indische Sociaal-Democratische Vereeniging, which was formally declared at the Matrozenbond Club, a seafarers' trade union club, in the Marinegebouw in Surabaya.

The ISDV was the first organisation to gain significant influence while openly declaring itself Marxist. Sneevliet and other ISDV figures soon established ties with organisations already active in the Dutch East Indies.

== Relations with Insulinde ==
One of the ISDV’s strategies for attracting supporters from various groups was to cooperate with organisations already active at the time.

The first organisation to cooperate with the ISDV was Insulinde. Insulinde itself was led by figures of mixed Indo-European descent and had earlier been pioneered by Karel Zaalberg, one of the early socialist figures. Their cooperation began around June 1914, only one month after the establishment of the ISDV. Cooperation between the ISDV and Insulinde took place during the election of members to the Surabaya Municipal Council.

However, this cooperation did not produce any significant results because the two organisations had different aims. The ISDV sought to advocate workers' rights and internationalism, while Insulinde aimed to increase the influence of the Indo-Dutch community in the Dutch East Indies.

== Gemeenteraad Surabaya Election ==
In June 1914, the Surabaya municipal government held an election for new members to fill seats on the council. For the first time, the ISDV entered practical politics. The ISDV formed a coalition with Insulinde to contest seats on the municipal council. The ISDV–Insulinde coalition developed two principal campaign proposals:

1. Social municipal council policy
2. Municipal Council Land Policy

The ISDV–Insulinde coalition advocated council representation for the "advanced indigenous" population, with indigenous representatives chosen on the basis of their competence in municipal affairs instead of appointment through family connections or aristocratic titles. This proposal called for democratic municipal elections that genuinely represented the electorate, which consisted largely of educated indigenous people and the middle class.

In this coalition, Coos Hartogh, the leader of the Surabaya branch of the ISDV, was selected as a candidate for the Municipal Council. The ISDV–Insulinde coalition formed a Socialist Faction within the council. The Socialist Faction competed against other political groups, including:

- Kiesvereeniging Soerabaja (Surabaya Electors' Association)
- Christelijk-Etisch Partij (Christian Ethical Party)
- Indischen Vrijzinig Bond (Indies Liberal League)

The election resulted in a victory for the ISDV–Insulinde coalition. Coos Hartogh was appointed as a member of the Surabaya Gemeenteraad and formed a Socialist Faction within the municipal council. Although the Socialist Faction remained a small minority in the council, this showed that the ISDV, only one month after its establishment, had become a political force to be reckoned with through its coalition with Insulinde.

== Het Vrije Woord ==
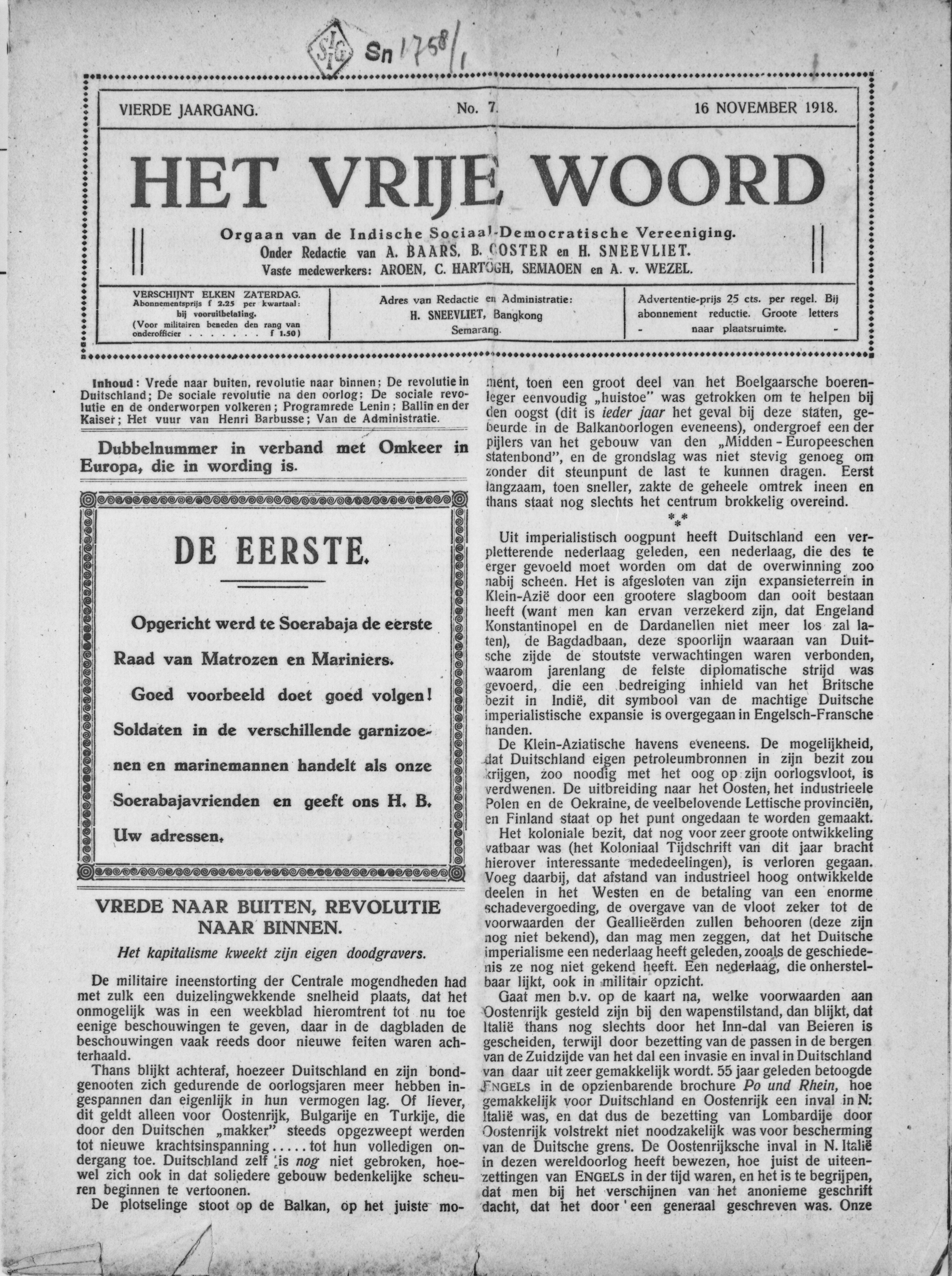
Edition of Het Vrije Woord, 16 November 1918.

The ISDV had a newspaper called Het Vrije Woord. The newspaper’s name meant "Free Expression", symbolising the liberalism and freedom of speech of the period. Adolf Baars was quite active in the management of Het Vrije Woord. The socialist newspaper circulated from 1915 to 1922. It competed with Oetoesan Hindia, a newspaper owned by the company NV Setia Oesaha, which was managed by figures from Sarekat Islam.

== Relations with SI ==
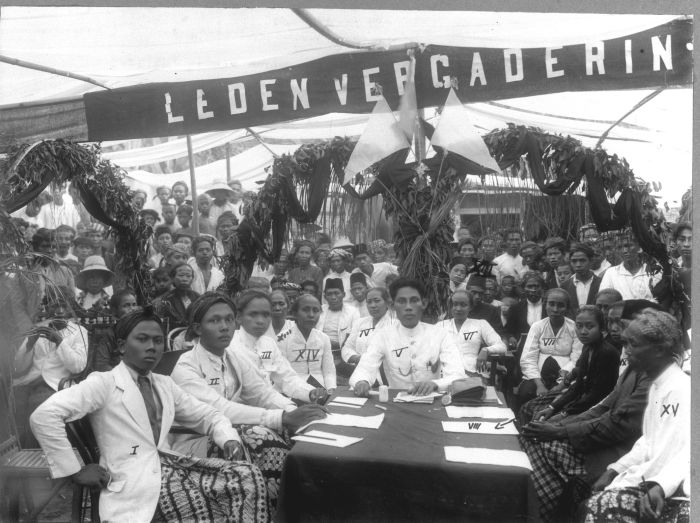
Meeting of SI and VSTP members in Kaliwungu.

The ISDV established relations with Sarekat Islam in 1915, when SI held its second congress in Yogyakarta. At first, relations between SI and the ISDV were close, although they occasionally became strained. Tjokroaminoto, as the leader of SI, succeeded in attracting the interest of a large part of the population and made SI the largest indigenous mass organisation in the Dutch East Indies. Several younger SI figures, including Semaun, Mas Alimin Prawirodirjo, and R. Darsono Notosudirjo, joined the ISDV. This was possible because, between 1912 and 1921, SI did not enforce party discipline, allowing its members to belong to other organisations at the same time.

This would later lead to a split within SI as its left-wing faction, known as SI Merah, became increasingly powerful. SI Merah was centred in Semarang, where Semaun and Darsono were active in the ISDV. Within a short time, Semaun attained important positions in both the ISDV and the VSTP, in which he was also highly active.

Sarekat Islam was never a centralised organisation like the ISDV, as its branches developed independently. The SI leadership therefore formed a council-like body to represent its many branches. Established in 1916, the organisation was known as the Central Sarekat Islam (CSI).

== The Bloc Within ==
As the leader of the ISDV, Sneevliet developed a strategy to increase the organisation’s influence within the nationalist movement. This strategy later became known as the “Bloc-Within”. In simple terms, Sneevliet’s strategy encouraged ISDV agents to infiltrate other movement organisations and spread the ISDV’s Marxist ideas. When necessary, these agents were expected to secure key positions within those organisations.

The principal organisation targeted by Sneevliet was Sarekat Islam. It was the largest and most influential organisation among the indigenous population. It would therefore represent a major advance if the ISDV succeeded in directing SI’s political course through cadres who had entered its leadership. In general, SI had been an ally of the ISDV within the movement from the beginning of their contact. In 1919, the two organisations briefly united to establish a radical front known as the Persatuan Pergerakan Kaoem Boeroeh (PPKB). At the same time, another organisation based on the unity of SI and ISDV forces as an anti-colonial voice within the colony was also formed under the name Persatuan Pergerakan Kemerdekaan Rakyat (PPKR).

However, because of the divisions that emerged toward the 1920s, both organisations in practice scarcely functioned as united fronts. The ISDV also used the PPKB and PPKR to spread its left-wing ideas within SI. Sarekat Islam figures such as Haji Agus Salim and Ki Bagus Hadikusumo became aware of this and eventually declared their opposition to the ISDV, beginning a period of hostility between the ISDV and SI. This hostility continued into the 1920s, by which time the ISDV had changed its name to the Perserikatan Kommunist Hindia in 1920 and the Communist Party of Indonesia in 1924.

The Bloc Within strategy did not succeed in gaining full control of SI, especially after Sneevliet was expelled from the Dutch East Indies around 1918. SI, under the leadership of Tjokroaminoto and Agus Salim, continued to survive under the banner of SI Putih. Sneevliet’s strategy achieved greater success in China, where, under the pseudonym Maring, he assisted Chen Duxiu in establishing the Chinese Communist Party (CCP).

== Shift in Leadership ==
After the First World War, the Dutch East Indies government prohibited Dutch representatives affiliated with communist parties from entering the colony. This was a response to the outbreak of the October Revolution of 1917, which overthrew the Romanov dynasty in Russia. Reports of the Troelstra Revolution in the Netherlands that lasted until 1923 also made the colonial government wary. Sneevliet and most of the Dutch members of the ISDV leadership were eventually deported from the Dutch East Indies.

Amid this leadership vacuum, the ISDV held a congress in Surabaya in 1919 to appoint a new leadership. The congress decided that C. Hartogh would become the new chairman of the ISDV. This prompted protests from several other ISDV figures, including Semaun and Baars, who disagreed with Hartogh’s views and appointment as chairman. In addition, a fierce debate over whether the ISDV should join the Comintern continued without resolution. The ISDV held its final congress on 23 May 1920. By this time, the organisation’s senior leadership positions had effectively passed into the hands of indigenous figures such as Semaun. The congress ultimately decided that the ISDV would join the Comintern and that its name would be changed to the Perserikatan Kommunist Hindia (PKH). Semaun was appointed as the new chairman of the central executive board (Hoofdbestuur). The congress ended the ISDV’s existence as a Dutch-led left-wing organisation and opened a new chapter as an indigenous communist organisation that would pursue a more radical course.[1]
