= Koningin Emmaschool =

Koningin Emmaschool, meaning Queen Emma School in Dutch, may refer to:

- Koningin Emmaschool (Surabaya), a technical school in the Dutch East Indies which operated from 1912 to 1941
- Koningin Emmaschool (Oud-Zuilen), a national monument and former school in Oud-Zuilen, Netherlands
- Koningin Emmaschool, a school in Haarlem built in 1938-9
