= Adolf Baars =

Dutch-Jewish politician (1892–1944)

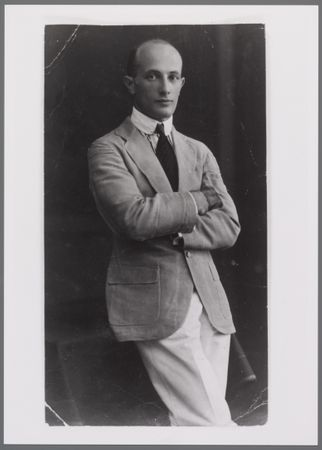
A portrait of Adolf Baars, Dutch communist, circa 1915–6.

Adolf Baars (born Asser Baars; 1892 in Amsterdam – 1944 in Auschwitz concentration camp) was a Dutch-Jewish Communist, engineer, and writer who is largely remembered today for his early role in the Indische Sociaal-Democratische Vereeniging and the Indonesian Communist Party.

== Biography ==
=== Early life ===
He was born Asser Baars in Amsterdam on April 20, 1892, although throughout his life he went by the name Dolf or Adolf. His parents were Benjamin Baars, a diamond worker, and Judith Nerden. He studied to become a Civil engineer in Delft, graduating in 1914. The college in Delft was a hotbed of student radicalism, and during his time there he joined the Amsterdam chapter of the Social Democratic Workers' Party. In October 1914 he married his first wife, Anna Catharina Cheriex, who was a doctor.

=== Dutch East Indies 1915-1921 ===
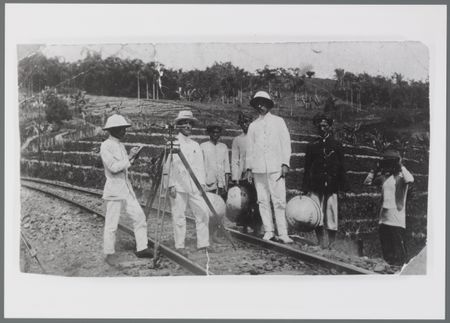
A photograph of Adolf Baars and others in the Dutch East Indies, location unknown, circa 1915-16

Late in 1914 Baars and his wife left the Netherlands for the Dutch East Indies, and Baars took up a post as an engineer in the state railway company (Staatsspoorwegen op Java) in Batavia in early 1915. In December 1915 he left that position to become a teacher at the Koningin Emmaschool, a technical school in Surabaya. One student of his during this time was Sukarno, the future independence leader and first president of Indonesia.

In the Indies, Baars soon became active in the Indische Sociaal-Democratische Vereeniging (Dutch: Indies Social Democratic Association), or ISDV, and in the fall of 1915 joined the editorial board of its new party newspaper, Het Vrije Woord, alongside Henk Sneevliet and D.J.A. Westerveld. The paper was one of the only Dutch papers in the Indies to have earned the respect of many Indonesians involved in the Indonesian National Awakening, first because it denounced the arrest of the radical Mas Marco in 1916, and then because it publicly opposed the Indië Weerbaar campaign to establish a 'native' army in the Indies.

Unlike many European socialists in the Indies, Baars worked hard to learn Malay and Javanese and used this knowledge to involve himself in Indonesian nationalist politics. Thus in April 1917 he helped found another newspaper, Soeara Merdika (Malay: Voice of freedom) with Semaun, Baars and Noto-Widjojo as editors. (This paper is not to be confused with Suara Merdeka, an unrelated paper founded in 1950.) Published twice a month, Soeara Merdika was aimed at the type of people who might read Het Vrije Woord but who could not read Dutch, and to spread Social Democratic ideals among Malay readers of the Indies. 'The paper failed and ceased publication within its first year, but Baars and his allies launched another paper, Soeara Ra'jat (Malay: People's Voice), in March 1918.

By October 1917 the colonial government tired of his political agitation and honorably discharged him from his teaching job in Surabaya. The final straw was when, in August 1917, he had been giving a speech in Malay at an ISDV meeting and called the colonial government busuk (Malay: rotten), and when confronted by his superiors later, did not convince them that he was repentant. The firing was widely covered in the Dutch press of the Indies; the Bataviaasch Nieuwsblad stated that Baars had defied the Government until his dismissal, so there was no need to feel sorry for him, and that he had in addition made "disgraceful" attacks on the education system in Het Vrije Woord. However, the Dutch-Indies Teachers' Union (NIOG), in its January 1918 meeting, determined that he had been unfairly fired and proposed to give him financial support, although in the end none was given. Their declaration stated that a teacher should be able to act like any other citizen, and if his speech crossed a line into criminal sedition, it should be a matter for the police, not his employer. He was eventually offered a municipal engineering job by the mayor of Semarang, who was also a Social Democrat; this enraged the conservative newspapers in the Indies, such as De Preangerbode and Het nieuws van den dag voor Nederlandsch-Indië.

Because the ISDV was mainly an urban party, Baars and others within the movement supported the creation of rural or agrarian organizations. In 1917 this was attempted with Porojitno, which meant to organize peasants and unskilled laborers, and in early 1918 this was reorganized as the Perhimpunan Kaoem Boeroeh dan Tani (Malay: Workers' and Peasants' Association) or PKBT. Baars played a major role in it at first, although by 1919 it was reorganized again and came more solidly under the leadership of Haji Misbach in Surakarta. He also helped found an Indonesian socialist group in Surabaya in 1917 called the Sama Rata Hindia Bergerak (Malay: Equality India in Motion) which soon grew to match the ISDV in size. Those types of organizing efforts can be explained by Baars' comments after the 1918 Sarekat Islam congress; he noted that the SI movement was still dominated by religious and nationalist elements, and hence he believed that separate organizations were necessary where members could be openly socialist and push for the SI to gradually take on a socialist character as well.

Baars was very inspired by the events of the October Revolution and other revolutionary events in Europe. Baars became chairman of the ISDV in 1917, a position he held until 1919. The ISDV began to organize soldiers and sailors in the Indies on the Soviet example, and managed to recruit over 3000 by the end of 1917.

In early 1919, after authorities deported his ally Sneevliet from the Indies, Baars left voluntarily and returned to the Netherlands. The government would soon deport most of the other European ISDV members in the Indies, leaving the organization in the hands of Indonesians such as Semaun and Darsono. However, Baars did not have much employment or political success in the Netherlands and returned to the Indies in early 1920, once again taking up the engineering position he had been offered in Semarang. Upon his return to the Indies he was much more vocally opposed to the Indonesian nationalist movement, saying that nationalism and patriotism were the opponents of socialism.

At the ISDV's annual meeting in May 1920, Baars was present and supported the proposal to rename the party to Perserikatan Kommunist di India (Malay: Communist union in the Indies). He wanted the party to avoid Revisionist tendencies and ally itself more explicitly with the Comintern. The motion was successful and the party was renamed. Het Vrije Woord now became the Dutch language organ of the renamed party, with Baars and P. Bergsma as editors, but due to the expulsion of many European socialists from the Indies, it apparently only had 40 subscribers by this time. In June 1920 he divorced his first wife, Anna Cheriex.

By early 1921, Baars was the only editor and announced he was closing the paper because he simply didn't have time to run a paper by himself on top of his other work. Bergsma later reappeared and may have restarted publication on his own, with some written contributions sent in by Baars. Years later allegations surfaced that he had come into conflict with the Communist party in his final years, even that he had been suspected to be a police informant and was expelled to the party in secret. Opposite rumours were also circulating that he was a Soviet spy with many fake passports and a huge cache of weapons. Of course, such allegations are difficult to prove after the fact.

In May 1921 the colonial government finally tired of his activities and detained Baars, expelling him from the Indies on the basis of the destabilizing influence of his communist propaganda work. His recent articles in Het Vrije Woord were also cited as reasons, including one protesting the arrest of a PKI member and another describing the German counter-revolution. The Semarang municipal council, which he still worked for, objected on the basis that he had never broken any of the laws on propaganda and political organizing—he had limited himself to teaching and philosophical political writings—but that the government had ignored the law and taken advantage of its "extraordinary right" (exhorbitante rechten) to nonetheless deport him. Semaun, Baars' longtime ally, spoke up at the same council meeting and stated that Baars' expulsion had shocked members of their party, because of how diligently he had stayed within the bounds of the law and sought to avoid offense to anyone in recent years. Before leaving the Indies, in May 1921, Baars also married his second wife, Onok Sawina.

=== Soviet Union 1921-1927 ===
In May 1921 Baars and Sneevliet met in Singapore with Darsono and sailed to Shanghai, from where Baars and Sneevliet took the train to Moscow to attend the 3rd World Congress of the Comintern. Baars ended up resettling in the Soviet Union with Onok Sawina, becoming an engineer at the Kuzbass Autonomous Industrial Colony in Siberia. There he came into close contact with other Dutch communists who were working in the colony, such as Sebalt Justinus Rutgers and Thomas Antonie Struik. It was later alleged in the Malay press in the Indies that he separated from his wife as early as 1922 and that she was living near Leningrad. In addition to his engineering work, he became a spokesman for the colony and worked for a time as its representative in Berlin. In 1927 he worked in the blast furnaces in Stalino (now Donetsk). However, he became disillusioned with communism and left the Soviet Union for the Netherlands at the end of 1927.

=== Time in the Netherlands 1927-1944 ===
Upon his return to the Netherlands, Baars started publishing books about economics from 1928 onwards. However, the book that caused the greatest stir was his 1928 Sowjet-Rusland in de practijk: Indië tot leering (Dutch: Soviet Russia in Practice: Lessons to India). In the book, which was widely publicized in the conservative Dutch press of the Indies, he maintained that he still sympathized with the colonized peoples of the Indies, but that after years of working in the USSR, he no longer though the Soviet system had the capability to emancipate them. He wrote that foreign delegates in the USSR like his former allies Semaun and Darsono had very limited social circles; they worked in an office, received foreign letters and press clippings, and lived in a hotel, knowing little about the country they were living in. These letters he sent to the Indies Dutch press summarizing his book were translated into Malay, Javanese and Sundanese by the government-funded publishing house Kantoor voor de Volkslectuur (Balai Pustaka), in the hopes that it would turn readers away from communism. A full-length book translation was even proposed but it is unclear if the translation that eventually came out received government funding or not. Baars' allegations about life in the USSR were received with somewhat more skepticism in the Malay press in the Indies. The Bintang Timoer speculated that he may have published it as 'revenge' for his poor treatment by the Soviets and that it was difficult to verify. Other Malay papers, such as Abdul Muis's Kaoem Moeda, saw a benefit to publishing it, since it might lead people back from the "darkness" of communism.

In the 1930s, Baars worked at the Netherlands Economic Institute in Rotterdam for some time. In April 1934 he divorced his second wife, Onok Sawinah, and married his third wife Aleida Lansink in October of the same year. and eventually returned to Delft, where he obtained a doctorate in technical science in 1937. In 1937 he officially changed his name to Adolf, the name he had gone by for most of his life. According to historian Ruth McVey, Baars became a supporter of Fascism in his final years.

On May 9, 1940, the day before the German invasion of Holland, Baars divorced his third wife, Aleida Lansink.

=== Deportation to Auschwitz ===
During the Second World War, Baars was deported to Auschwitz concentration camp, where he was killed on March 6, 1944.

== Selected publications ==
- Het proces Sneevliet: de Sociaal-democratie in Nederlandsch-Indië (1917, with Henk Sneevliet)
- De samenzwering in het Dongebied (1928)
- Sowjet-Rusland in de practijk: Indië tot leering (1928)
- Het verbruik van algemeen benoodigde consumptieartikelen: een dynamische berekeningsmethode van enkele economische structuurwijzigingen (1933)
- Seizoensbewegingen in het economisch leven van Nederland (Seasonal movements in the economic life of the Netherlands) (1934, with H.M.H.A. van der Valk)
- Openbare werken en conjunctuurbeweging (Public works planning and the business cycle) (1937)
- Onderzoek naar de mogelijkheid tot beïnvloeding der conjunctuurbeweging door kapitaaluitgaven der overheid en door andere overheidsmaatregelen (1937)
