= Koningin Emmaschool (Surabaya) =

The Koningin Emmaschool voor technisch onderwijs (Dutch: Queen Emma School for technical education), often referred to as the Koningin Emmaschool or KES, was an intermediate-level (MULO) technical school in Surabaya, Dutch East Indies which operated from 1913 to 1941.

== History ==
The Koningin Emmaschool was founded in 1913 as an extension of an existing nightschool program, the Burgeravondschool. It was named after Emma of Waldeck and Pyrmont, Queen consort of the Netherlands at the time. Equivalent institutions elsewhere in the Indies were the Koningin Wilhelmina School (Batavia) and the Prinses Juliana School (Yogyakarta). The students in the initial cohort were all Europeans or Indos.

In 1915 Adolf Baars, a political radical who would later be one of the founding figures of the Indonesian Communist Party, became a teacher at the KES. During his time there he made an impression on future Indonesian leader Sukarno, who was then studying in Surabaya although possibly not at the KES. However, Baars was dishonorably discharged from his position at the school in October 1917 for giving an anti-government speech and refusing to apologize. The firing was widely covered in the Dutch press of the Indies; the Bataviaasch Nieuwsblad stated that Baars had defied the Government until his dismissal, so there was no need to feel sorry for him, and that he had in addition made "disgraceful" attacks on the education system in his newspaper Het Vrije Woord. However, the Dutch-Indies Teachers' Union (NIOG), in its January 1918 meeting, determined that he had been unfairly fired and proposed to give him financial support, although in the end none was given.

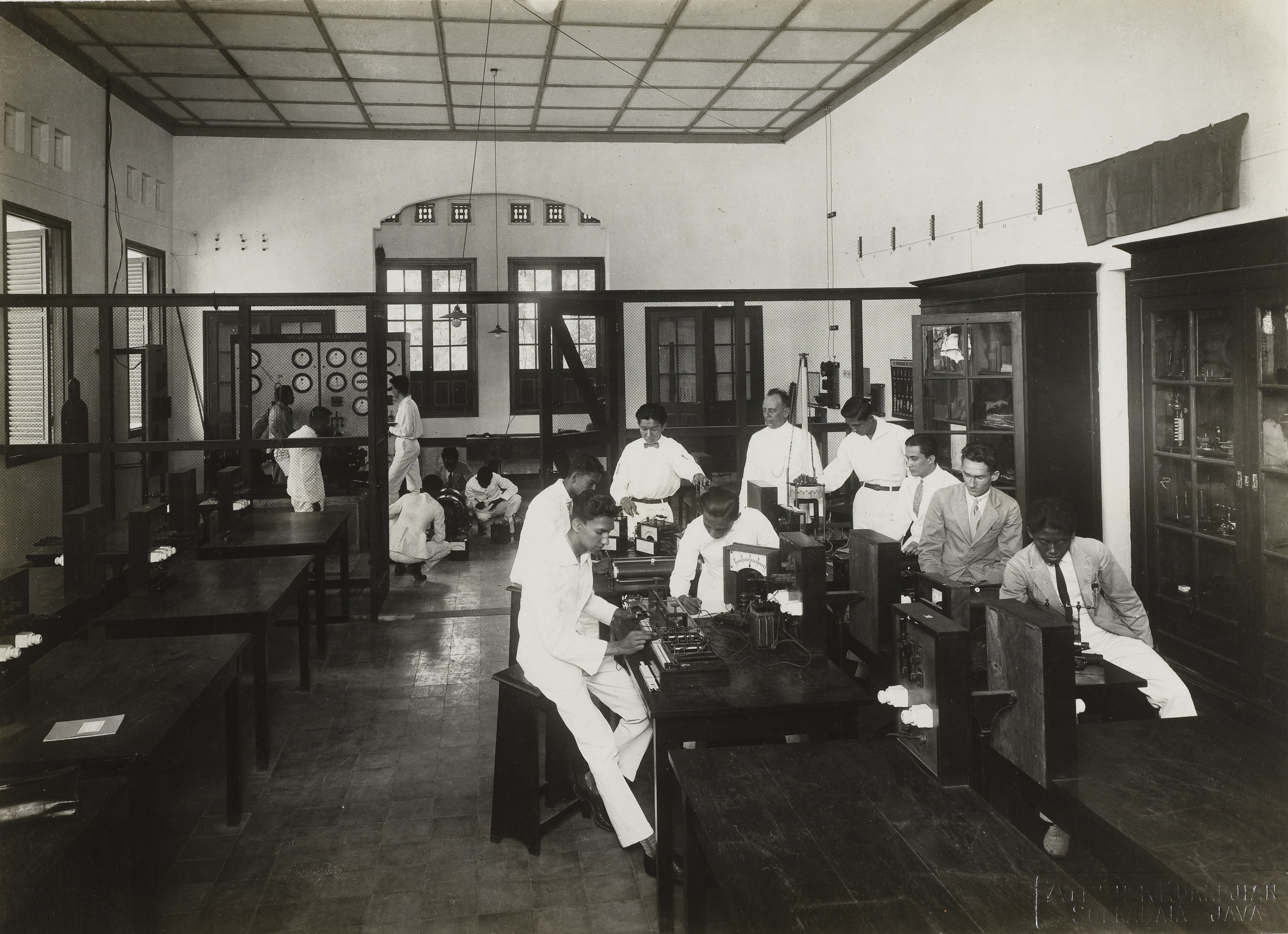
Electrician's laboratory in the Queen Emma School for Technical Education in Surabaya - circa 1915

In 1922 the school relocated to a new building on Prins Henrikkade.

In 1935–36, the school was approaching its 25th anniversary and a decision was made to erect a monument to Queen Emma, who had died in 1934, on the grounds of the school. However, after some debate it was eventually decided to build it in a more grand location in Kroesenpark, which was renamed Emmapark. Fundraising was done among current and former students and teachers of the KES and it was built and unveiled in 1937. The monument was gone by 1942 and is thought to have been destroyed by the Japanese during their Dutch East Indies campaign.

When the Japanese seemed poised to invade the Indies, the colonial air defense recruited heavily from among the technically trained students at the KES, the last cohort being allowed to graduate early in 1941.

In 1950, there was an attempt to reopen the school, but there were not enough Dutch-speaking teachers available.
