= Het Vrije Woord (Dutch East Indies newspaper) =

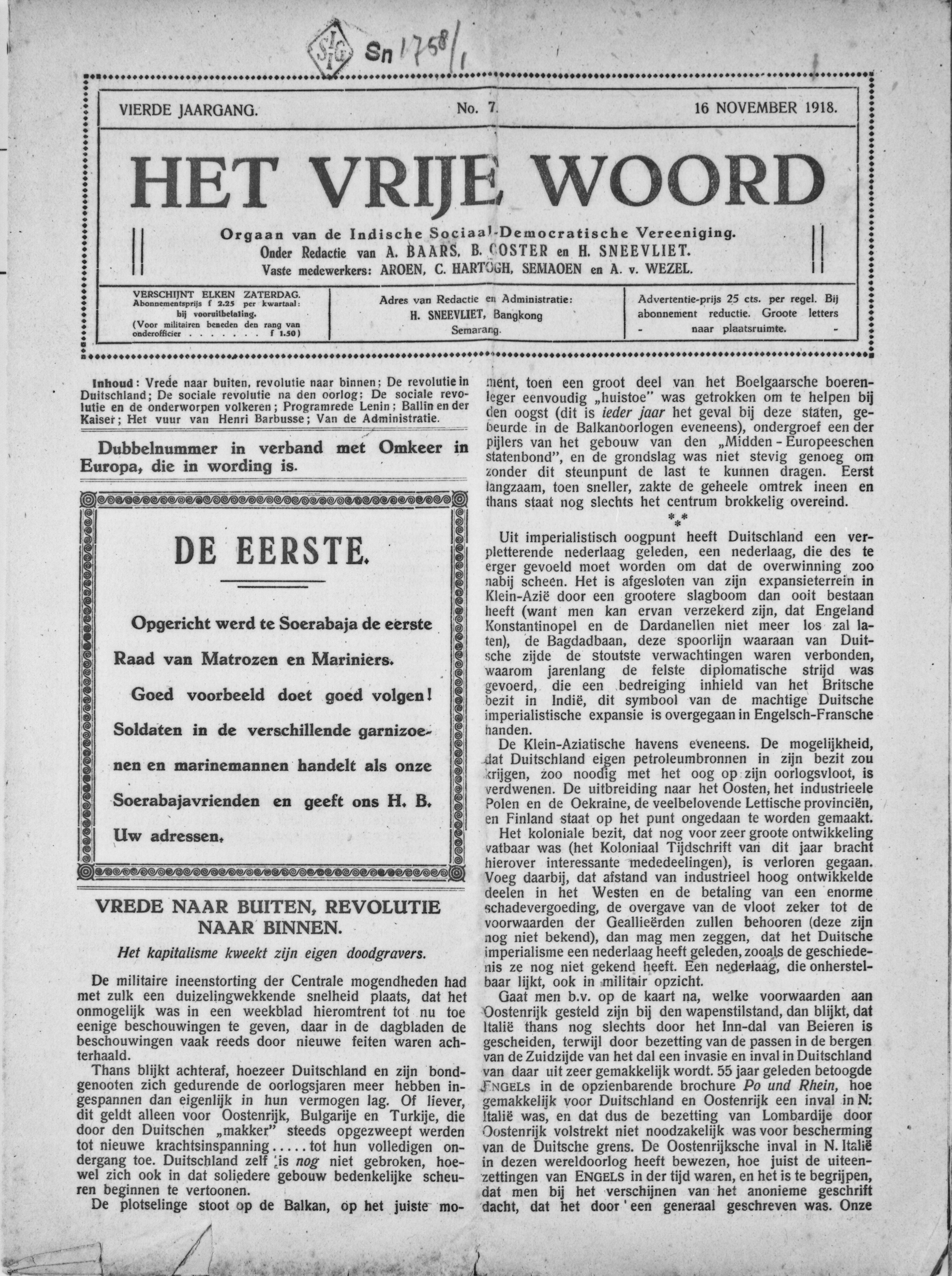
Front page of Het Vrije Woord Nov 16 1918

Het Vrije Woord (Dutch; literally "The Free Word", or "Free Expression") was a left-wing newspaper printed in the Dutch East Indies from 1915 to 1922, associated with the Indische Sociaal-Democratische Vereeniging (Dutch: Indies Social Democratic Association) and the Indonesian Communist Party in its early years.

== History ==
Het Vrije Woord was founded in the fall of 1915 as the party newspaper of the Indische Sociaal-Democratische Vereeniging (Dutch: Indies Social Democratic Association), which itself was initially made up of European members of various Dutch parties, notably the Social Democratic Workers' Party (Netherlands). The editorial board on its launch was Henk Sneevliet, an experienced socialist who had arrived in the Indies in 1913, Adolf Baars, a newly graduated engineer and radical who had only just arrived in the Indies, and D.J.A. Westerveld, a Centrist. In its first year, the paper did not present itself as the mouthpiece of the ISDV, but simply a "general independent semimonthly organ". It was only in June 1916 that it started billing itself as the official ISDV paper.

Because the paper was printed in the Dutch language, a language which by official policy was mainly understood by Europeans and only a tiny minority of Asians with an elite education, the paper was not widely read by Indonesians or Indonesian Chinese. In late 1916 only 10 percent of its readers were estimated to be Indonesians. However, the paper still earned the respect of many nationalistic Indonesians in its early years, first because it denounced the arrest of the radical Mas Marco in 1916, and then because it publicly opposed the Indië Weerbar campaign to establish a 'native' army in the Indies. This was in stark contrast to most Dutch newspapers in the Indies, such as Bataviaasch Nieuwsblad or De Preangerbode, which had a highly racist attitude towards the native population and was contemptuous of any attempt at their advancement, or even liberal papers like De Locomotief which was sympathetic to them at times but still believed in the colonial order.

Recognizing the limitations of only spreading Social Democratic propaganda to Europeans in the Indies, Baars worked hard to learn Malay and Javanese. Thus in April 1917 he helped found a Malay sister paper, Soeara Merdika (Malay: Voice of freedom) with himself and two Indonesian socialists, Semaun and Noto-Widjojo as editors.(This paper is not to be confused with Suara Merdeka, an unrelated paper founded in 1950.) The content and goals of this paper were similar to Het Vrije Woord. 'The paper failed and ceased publication within its first year, but Baars and his allies launched another paper, Soeara Ra'jat (Malay: People's Voice), in March 1918.

In October 1917 Baars was "honorably discharged" him from his teaching job in a technical school in Surabaya, where he had worked since 1915. In August 1917, he had been giving a speech in Malay at an ISDV meeting and called the colonial government busuk (Malay: rotten), and when confronted by his superiors later, did not convince them that he was repentant. The firing was widely covered in the Dutch press of the Indies; the Bataviaasch Nieuwsblad stated that Baars had defied the Government until his dismissal, so there was no need to feel sorry for him, and that he had in addition made "disgraceful" attacks on the education system in Het Vrije Woord.

In 1918, the colonial government deported Het Vrije Woord editor Sneevliet from the Indies for his organizing work among Dutch soldiers and Sailors, and then in early 1919 Baars also left voluntarily and returned to the Netherlands. The government would soon deport most of the other European ISDV members in the Indies, which certainly reduced the potential readership of the paper. However, in 1919 Het Vrije Woord added Pieter Bergsma, another European socialist in the Indies who also edited his own paper Volharding, as a replacement for Baars. Bergsma was born in Friesland but had been in the Indies since 1914, and had served as a Sergeant in the Dutch Indies army before retiring and entering politics and journalism. Baars did not have much employment or political success in the Netherlands and returned to the Indies in early 1920.

In 1920 when the ISDV was refounded as the Indonesian Communist Party, Het Vrije Woord now became the Dutch language organ of the renamed party, with Baars and Bergsma remaining as editors, but due to the expulsion of many European socialists from the Indies, it apparently only had 40 subscribers by this time.

In January 1921, Bergsma was sentenced to 3 months in prison by the local court (Raad van Justitie) in Semarang. Thus Baars was the only active editor, and by March announced he was closing the paper because he simply didn't have time to run a paper by himself on top of his other work. Not long after, the government detained him as well, and then deported him from the Indies on the basis of the destabilizing influence of his communist propaganda work. His recent articles in Het Vrije Woord were also cited as reasons, including one protesting the arrest of a PKI member, another describing the German counter-revolution, and one criticizing the practice of Pretrial detention in the Indies. Semaun, Baars' longtime ally, spoke up in his defence saying that Baars' expulsion had shocked members of the Communist party, because of how diligently he had stayed within the bounds of the law and sought to avoid offense to anyone.

After the end of his prison sentence, around the time of Baars' deportation, Bergsma reappeared and declared he would be resuming publication of Het Vrije Woord on his own, with some written contributions sent in by Baars. He continued to publish the paper until early 1922, when he too was called in by the authorities (along with fellow communist Tan Malaka; both were given a deportation order. It is unclear who edited the final issues, but in May 1922 the paper announced it would not be continuing due to it dwindling readership, and that they would now be putting their efforts into the Malay language sister paper, Soeara Ra'jat.
