= Preanger Regencies Residency =

Dutch East Indies administrative division in Java

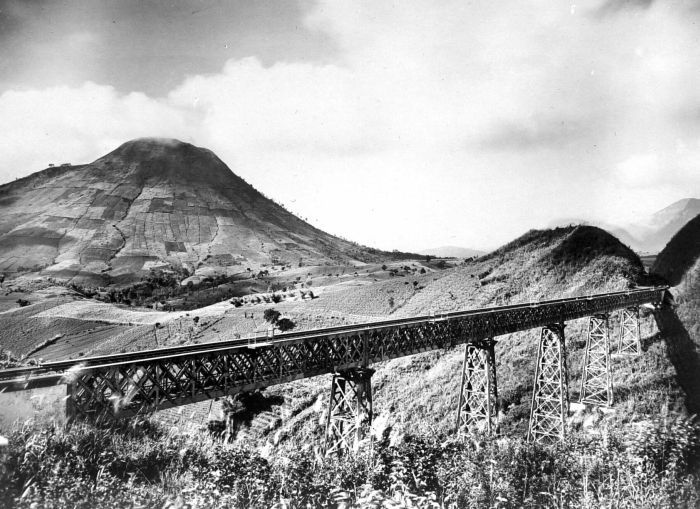
A train bridge in Preanger, date unknown

Preanger Regencies Residency (Dutch: Residentie Preanger-Regentschappen), sometimes referred to as Preanger Residency and renamed Priangan Residency after 1931, was an administrative division (residency) of the Dutch East Indies located in Parahyangan, West Java which existed from 1817 to 1925. Its capital was in Cianjur until 1856 and thereafter in Bandung. The residency contained the municipality of Bandung and the regencies (regentschap) of Bandoeng, Soemedang, Tasikmalaja, Tjiamis and Garoet.

== History ==
=== Prehistory ===
In the sixteenth and seventeenth centuries, the area of Preanger (Parahyangan) had belonged to the Mataram Sultanate. In the late seventeenth century, the Dutch East India Company allied itself with Mataram, but demanded territorial and trade concessions. During this time, the Dutch started to exert more and more influence in the Western part of Java. Mataram finally ceded all control of Cheribon and regions to the south, including the Preanger region, in 1705. The eastern part of what would become this residency was at first ruled from Cirebon in a residency called the Cheribonsche Preanger Regentschappen, while the western parts were allowed to remain under the control of local princes. That situation remained until 1808, when Napoleonic governor Herman Willem Daendels reorganized the territory in a prefecture (the Batavian and Priangan Regencies) and connected it to Batavia via the Great Post Road.

=== Residency ===
In 1818, after the short French and British interregnum in the Dutch East Indies, the territory was reestablished by the Dutch as the Preanger Regencies Residency.

The residency as established in 1818 consisted of three major divisions:

- Cianjur and Sukabumi, ruled directly by the resident whose seat was at Cianjur;
- Bandung;
- Sumedang, Sukapura and Limbangan.

The capital of the residency was transferred from Cianjur to Bandung in 1856, but the seat of the resident himself was not moved there until 1864. In 1866, Limbangan was also separated to be its own division with an Assistant Resident.

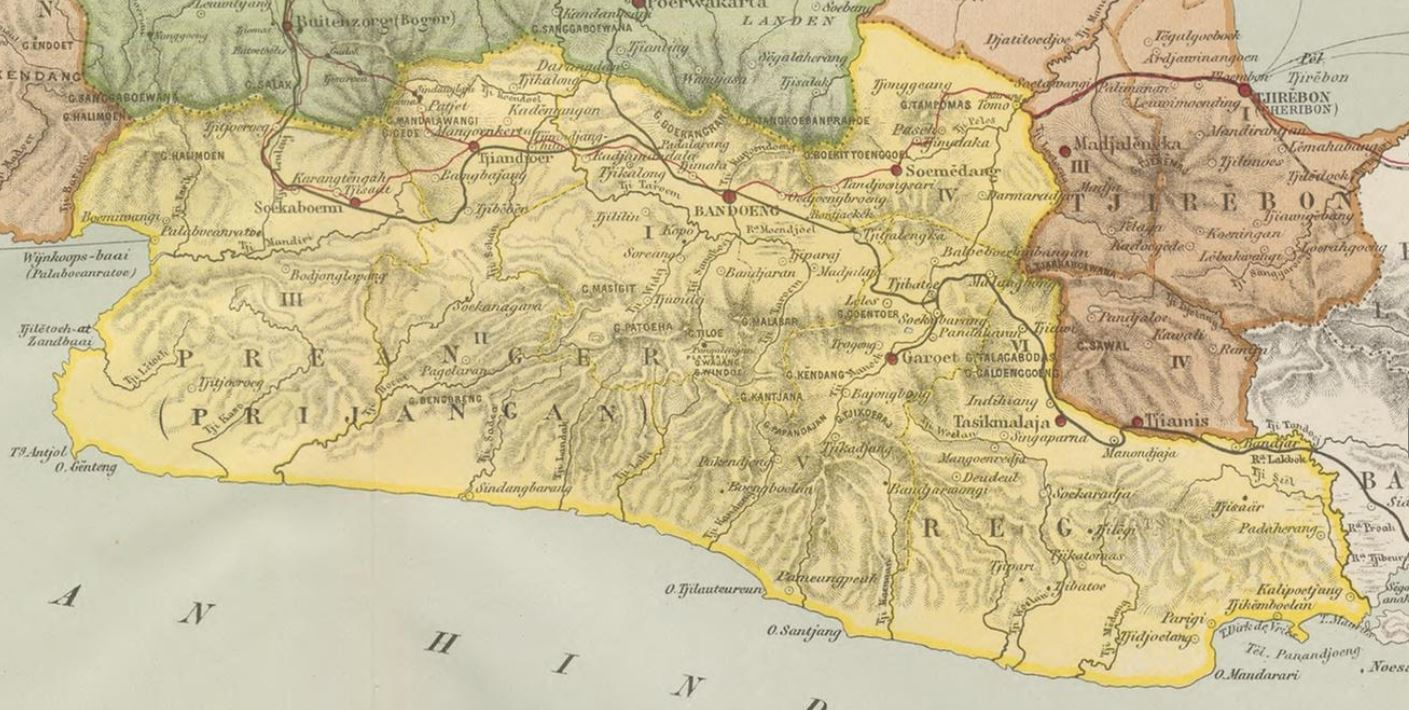
1909 Malay-language map of Preanger Regencies

During the early twentieth century, the residency had a number of Tea estates in its mountainous areas, as well as being a center of Tapioca flour production in the Indies. It was also one of the earliest areas in the Indies to industrialize significantly. During this time, Bandung was also the location of the first university in the Indies and the place where a number of important printing presses were located, including the popular newspaper De Preangerbode.

In 1915, Garut Regency was transferred from the Cheribon Residency to Preanger. In 1925, the four residencies of western Java were subdivided into nine new residencies. The former Preanger Regencies Residency was broken up into three smaller residencies: West-Priangan, Midden-Priangan en Oost-Priangan. However, in 1931 they were reorganized once again, with parts of the former residency now being divided between Buitzenzorg Residency and the renamed Priangan Residency. Those borders were kept by the Japanese during their occupation of Java during World War II, and for a short time by the Republic of Indonesia after 1945.

== List of residents ==
- Gerrit Willem Casimir van Motman: 1817–1819
- Robert Lieve Jasper van der Capellen: 1819–1825
- Pieter le Clereq: 1825–1827
- Willem Nicolaas Servatius: 1827–1828
- Otto Carel Holmberg de Beckfelt: 1828–1837
- Pieter le Clereq: 1837–1839
- Johan Frans Hora Siccama: 1839–1841
- Jean Baptiste Cleerens: 1841–1846
- Pieter Johannes Overhand: 1846–1850
- Carl Philip Conrad Steinmetz: 1851–1855
- Herman Constantijn van der Wijck: 1855–1858
- Christiaan van der Moore: 1858–1874
- Ferdinand Theodoor Pahud de Mortanges: 1874–1879
- Jan Marinus van Vleuten: 1879–1884
- Albert Gustaaf George Peltzer–1884–1887
- Johannes Heijting: 1887–1891
- Johannes Diederik Harders: 1891–1894
- Christiaan Willem Kist: 1894–1900
- Eduard Thomas Theodorus Henricus van Benthem van den Bergh: 1900–1903
- Gustaaf Adolf Frederik Jan Oosthout: 1903–1907
- Willem Frederik Lamoraal Boissevain: 1907–1911
- Gideon Jan Oudemans: 1911–1913
- Tielus Jan Janssen: 1913–1917
- Louis de Stuers: 1917–1920
- Willem Pieter Hillen: 1920–1921
- August Johan Herman Eijken: 1921–1925
