= Okaba =

- Village
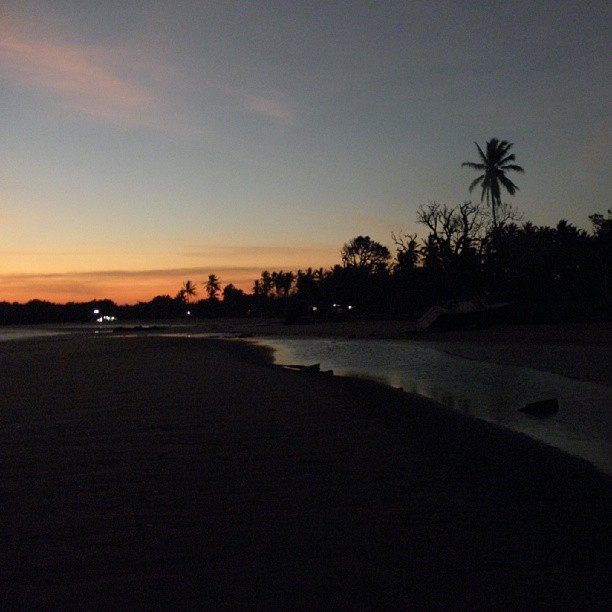
- Okaba village at dusk

- Location in Western New Guinea and Indonesia Okaba (Indonesia)
- Coordinates: 8°05′S 139°43′E
- Country: Indonesia
- Province: South Papua
- Regency: Merauke Regency

Area
  - Total: 7,406 km^{2} (2,859 sq mi)

Population (2018 est.)
  - Total: 1,270
  - Density: 1,714/km^{2} (4,440/sq mi)
- Time zone: UTC+9 (WIT)
- Climate: Af

Okaba is a coastal town in Merauke Regency, South Papua, Indonesia.

== History ==
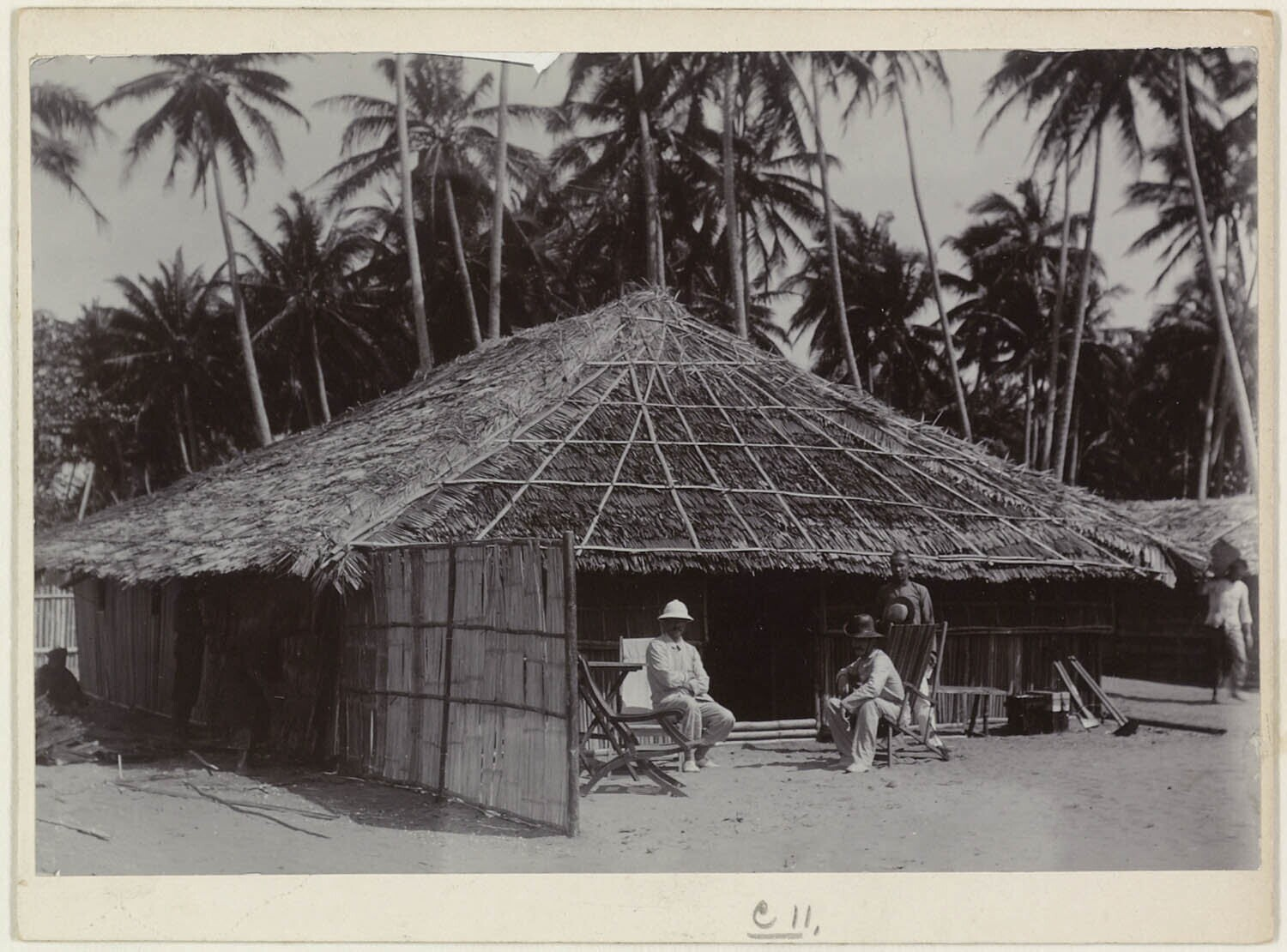
Dutch officers in front of their quarters in Okaba, somewhere between 1907 and 1915

The village was established as a government post and a police station in 1907 by the Dutch, not long after the foundation of Merauke in 1902. The goal was to stop Marind-anim headhunting raids in the area. In July 1910, a catholic mission was founded there by the Dutch priest Jos van der Kolk. Although the mission shut down in 1915, it reopened in 1922, under the supervision of a Belgian priest, Peter Vertenten, who had previously worked in Belgian Congo. In August 1943, a small outpost of the Australian army under the command of an infantry sergeant was established there, as part of the defense of Merauke against a possible Japanese invasion. After the Dutch withdrawal from Western New Guinea in 1962, it became part of Indonesia.

== Climate ==
Okaba has a tropical savanna climate (Aw) with heavy rainfall from November to May to and moderate to little rainfall from June to October.

Climate data for Okaba
Month	Jan	Feb	Mar	Apr	May	Jun	Jul	Aug	Sep	Oct	Nov	Dec	Year
Mean daily maximum °C (°F)	31.1 (88.0)	30.9 (87.6)	31.0 (87.8)	31.0 (87.8)	30.4 (86.7)	29.4 (84.9)	28.7 (83.7)	29.1 (84.4)	30.4 (86.7)	31.3 (88.3)	32.0 (89.6)	31.7 (89.1)	30.6 (87.1)
Daily mean °C (°F)	27.1 (80.8)	27.0 (80.6)	27.1 (80.8)	27.0 (80.6)	26.5 (79.7)	25.5 (77.9)	25.0 (77.0)	24.9 (76.8)	25.7 (78.3)	26.6 (79.9)	27.3 (81.1)	27.4 (81.3)	26.4 (79.6)
Mean daily minimum °C (°F)	23.1 (73.6)	23.1 (73.6)	23.2 (73.8)	23.0 (73.4)	22.6 (72.7)	21.6 (70.9)	21.3 (70.3)	20.8 (69.4)	21.0 (69.8)	21.9 (71.4)	22.6 (72.7)	23.1 (73.6)	22.3 (72.1)
Average precipitation mm (inches)	288 (11.3)	229 (9.0)	277 (10.9)	190 (7.5)	135 (5.3)	52 (2.0)	48 (1.9)	20 (0.8)	26 (1.0)	64 (2.5)	132 (5.2)	214 (8.4)	1,675 (65.8)
Source: Climate-Data.org

== Bibliography ==
- Steenbrink, Karel (2008). Catholics in Indonesia, 1808-1942: A Documented History. Vol. 2: The Spectacular Growth of a Self Confident Minority, 1903–1942. Leiden, Netherlands: KITLV Press. ISBN 9-0671-8260-5.
- Dexter, David (1961). The New Guinea Offensives. Australia in the War of 1939–1945. Series 1 – Army. Volume 6. Canberra: Australian War Memorial. OCLC 2028994.
- Statistics Indonesia. "Kecamatan Okaba Dalam Angka 2019 (Okaba Subdistrict in Numbers, 2019)" (in Indonesian).
