= Darsono =

Indonesian Communist

Raden Darsono Notosudirdjo
- Born: 1 December 1897; Pati, Dutch East Indies
- Died: 31 December 1976 (aged 79); Semarang, Central Java, Indonesia

Raden Darsono Notosudirdjo, more commonly known simply as Darsono, was a journalist and editor of Sinar Hindia, an activist in the Sarekat Islam and chairman of the Indonesian Communist Party from 1920 to 1925.

== Biography ==
=== Early life ===
Darsono was born in Pati, Central Java, Dutch East Indies in 1897. Despite his later prominence, he only had a primary school education, a fact which was later held against him by his critics.

=== Involvement in Indonesian National Awakening ===
Darsono was converted to the cause of socialism when he attended the trial of Henk Sneevliet. He was impressed that a Dutch person would be willing to lose everything in order to side with the little person. He became a member of the Indische Sociaal-Democratische Vereeniging and became secretary of the Semarang branch in 1918.

The Sarekat Islam (Malay: Islamic Union) was the first mass organization of Indigenous people in the Indies, who organized themselves loosely around the identity of Islam. But the organization contained quite a lot of ideological diversity, with Islamic nationalism (led by Cokroaminoto, Agus Salim and Abdul Muis), communists (led by Semaoen, Darsono and Alimin), and a synthesis of the two by Haji Misbach. In 1918, Darsono became a paid propagandist for the SI and became well known for his tireless effort to drive that organization to the left. Although the leaders of the "Central Sarekat Islam" based in Batavia were skeptical of the move towards communism, they appointed Semaoen to their board as well as making Darsono propagandist. For this the central organization tried to make a deal with them to not publicly split with the organization or propagandize against them. During this time he was skeptical of the Insulinde party which had been founded by E.F.E. Douwes Dekker, Tjipto Mangoenkoesoemo and Soewardi Soerjaningrat. He expressed in meetings and articles that he believed that party mainly represented Indo people and that if they came to power they would relegate native Indonesians to a subservient position.

In May 1920, Semaoen refounded the ISDV as the Partai Komunis di Hindia (Malay: Communist Party in the Indies), which 9 months later would be renamed the Partai Komunis Indonesia (Indonesian Communist Party). At that time Darsono was still in prison in Surabaya.

In October 1920 the Semarang wing of the Sarekat Islam, and Darsono in particular, came into conflict with the central group of the organization in Batavia. Darsono was accused of breaking the truce with the central Sarekat Islam that had been agreed upon in 1917. In the pages of Sinar Hindia, he accused Sarekat Islam leader Cokroaminoto of embezzling money from the organization. Of course, Cokroaminoto took it as a stab in the back.

=== Soviet Union and Europe ===
Darsono left the Indies to travel through Siberia to Western Europe during 1921-23. During that trip, in 1921, he represented the PKI at the third Congress of the Comintern in Moscow. After that he worked for the Comintern in Berlin. He also spoke at a congress of the Dutch Dutch Communist Party in Groningen in 1921. In that speech he called for closer collaboration between the Dutch and Indonesian communist parties in the interest of reducing racial hatred.

Darsono returned to Moscow in 1922. While he was abroad the Dutch authorities in the Indies discussed that he should be treated similarly to Semaoen and not allowed to reenter the colony when he came back from Europe. However, he did manage to reenter the Indies in 1923.

In 1923 the Semarang authorities and the Governor General debated whether Darsono and Semaoen should be deported from the Indies, but decided against it for the time being. Although they were aggressively organizing strikes and spreading the communist message, the authorities thought that deporting them might not change anything.

During this time, Darsono was relatively moderate as a communist compared to Semaoen, in that he did not believe in the use of bombings, terror or other methods.

Darsono was finally arrested in 1925 and expelled from the Indies in 1926 If he was a more moderate figure, with him and the other PKI founders gone, the party became far more radical. The ill-fated 1926 PKI revolt happened while he and Semaoen were out of the country, and even though they tried to negotiate on the Indonesian communists' behalf with the Soviet party, they were increasingly out of touch and unable to be of help from where they were. Adolf Baars, a Dutch communist who had been involved in the early years of the ISDV but had been deported from the Indies early on, mentioned Semaoen and Darsono in a 1928 book he published about life in the Soviet Union. He wrote that foreign representatives working in the country often had very limited social circles, and that people like Semaoen and Darsono worked in an office, received foreign letters and press clippings, and lived in a hotel, knowing little about the country they were living in.

He returned to the Soviet Union via Singapore and China; under the pseudonym of Samin, he worked for the Comintern for a number of years. He was even elected as an alternate member of the Executive Committee of the Communist International in 1928. In 1929 he also ran for office on the Dutch Communist Party list. However, he was expelled from the Comintern in 1931.

Darsono was still in Berlin in 1935 when the Nuremberg Laws were passed. At this time many communists fled Germany, but he was unable to escape for a time, and so he left his son Alam Darsono to stay with Bran Bleekrode, a Jewish violinist living in Amsterdam whose cousin Bram Bleekrode was organizing places to stay for communists fleeing Germany. However, Darsono was apparently able to rejoin his son in Amsterdam later in 1935, where he stayed for a number of years.;

=== After Indonesian independence ===
Upon Indonesia's independence from the Netherlands, Darsono finally returned to the country in 1950, after twenty years of being barred from entry. He broke with his previous communist views and became an advisor at the Indonesian Ministry of Foreign Affairs until 1960. Darsono died 1976 in Semarang.
