= Suara Merdeka =

Indonesian daily newspaper in Semarang

- Perekat Komunitas Jawa Tengah (lit. 'Central Java Community's Bond')
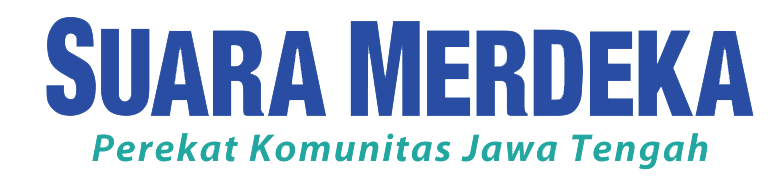
- Type: Daily newspaper
- Owner: Suara Merdeka Network
- Founder: H. Hetami
- Founded: 11 February 1950; 76 years ago
- Language: Indonesia
- Headquarters: Menara Suara Merdeka; Jl. Pandanaran 30; Semarang, Jawa Tengah
- City: Semarang
- Country: Indonesia
- Sister newspapers: Wawasan
- ISSN: 2615-2614
- Website: www.suaramerdeka.com

Suara Merdeka (lit. 'Voice of Freedom') is a daily newspaper in Indonesia based in Semarang, Central Java. It was established by H. Hetami and the first edition was published on 11 February 1950.

== History ==
Suara Merdeka was founded by H. Hetami, who also became chief editor, on 11 February 1950. The paper began as an evening daily newspaper published in Solo; the newspaper printed 5,000 copies, which at that time is a considerable amount for a local newspaper. He was assisted by three reporters: HR. Wahjoedi, Soelaiman, and Retno Koestiyah. Then, Suara Merdeka began expanding its distribution to Kudus and Semarang to compete with other local newspapers.

In the beginning, Suara Merdeka did not yet have its printing press, so that they were based at the offices of De Locomotief, a Dutch newspaper in Semarang. After 1956, the newspaper changed its publishing time to the morning after H. Hetami got a printing machine himself. The newspaper also has its own office in the former office of Het Noorden newspaper that has been nationalized by the Indonesian government in March 1963.

== Award ==
In December 2011, Suara Merdeka won an award for "The Most Responsive Media".
