= Alimin =

National Hero of Indonesia

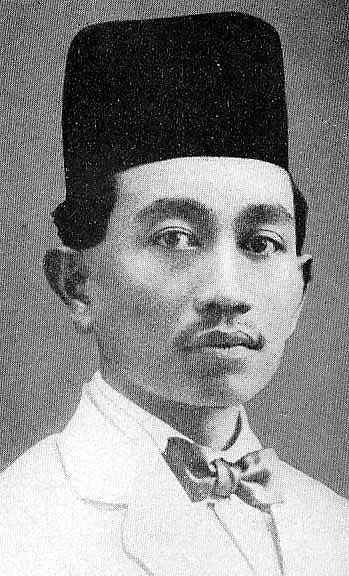

General Secretary of the Communist Party of Indonesia
- In office 1926 – January 1951
- Succeeded by: D. N. Aidit

Personal details
- Born: Alimin bin Prawirodirdjo; 1889 Surakarta, Dutch East Indies
- Died: 26 June 1964 (aged 74–75) Jakarta, Indonesia
- Party: Insulinde; PKI
- Spouse: Hajjah Mariah
- Children: 2

Alimin bin Prawirodirdjo (1889 – 26 June 1964) was an Indonesian independence movement figure and also Indonesian communist.

Since he was a teenager Alimin was active on national movements. He was a member of Budi Utomo, Sarekat Islam, Insulinde, before he joined with the Communist Party of Indonesia (PKI) and eventually he became leader of the organization. He was also founder of Sarekat Buruh Pelabuhan (formerly called Sarekat Pegawai Pelabuhan dan Lautan).

In early 1926, as the leader of the PKI, Alimin went to Singapore to negotiate with Tan Malaka in order to prepare rebellion. But, before Alimin went home, the rebellion broke out on 12 November 1926. Alimin and Musso were arrested by British colonial police.

== Early life ==
Alimin was born in Delangu village, Surakarta in 1889. His father was Prawirodirdjo. As a kid, at the age of nine, he was adopted by G. A. J. Hazeu, a Dutch official. He was interested in politics and journalism, defying Hazeu's plan for him to become government official.

In his youth, he worked for Djawa Moeda newspaper and was a member of Budi Utomo Jakarta branch at the age of 22. After Sarekat Islam was widely known, he joined the organization in 1915 together with Semaun and Darsono believing Budi Utomo only benefited upper class people, not peasants. He lived in HOS Tjokroaminoto's house in Surabaya together with Soekarno, Kartosuwiryo, Musso, and Semaun. He was dubbed "Tjokroaminoto's man" by Shiraishi. He was also a member of Insulinde. He was also an editor for journal Modjopahit.

Alimin's first encounter with socialism was because H. J. F. M. Sneevliet, the founder of Indische Sociaal Democratische Vereinging (ISDV; Social Democratic Association), frequently visited Tjokroaminoto's house. Alimin, Musso, and Semaun was interested in the ideology and became ISDV activists. Later, Alimin, Darsono, and Semaun led a faction that was influenced by Marxism and socialism, dubbed SI Merah (Red SI) that was based in Semarang.

== PKI activities ==
In 1918, Alimin was the head of ISDV Batavia branch and was a member of central leadership of the party. While in Batavia, Alimin served as part of the editorial team of the newspaper Sinar Hindia.

Alimin helped Adolf Baars founded Perhimpunan Kaoem Boeroeh dan Tani (Association of Workers and Farmers). He had worked for Mitsui, a Japanese company, branch in Batavia, but later was fired by Mitsui under Dutch government's request. Sometimes before 1918, together with Sosrokardono, Alimin led Perserikatan Pegawai Pegadaian Boemipoetra (PPPB, Native Pawnshop Workers’ Union), which the latter became the vice chairman.

In May 1919, during a PPPB congress in Bandung, Alimin, together with Sosrokardono, Semaun, and Bergsma, discussed the formation of a federation uniting the labor unions of SI and ISDV, initially considering the name Revolutionary Socialist Federation of Labor Unions. On 25 December 1919, a provisional federation was established in Yogyakarta, bringing together 22 unions with a combined membership of around 72,000 workers. Semaun was chosen as chairman and proposed that the federation's name should include the word "revolutionary" a suggestion even supported by the usually more moderate Agus Salim. However, Alimin opposed the idea, arguing that such a label might discourage white-collar workers. As a compromise, the organization was officially named Persatoean Perserikatan Kaoem Boeroeh (PPKB, or Concentration of Trade Unions, also referred to as Vakcentrale).

There was an incident regarding SI Afdeling B around 1919-1920. In 1919, a farmers’ uprising broke out in Garut when peasants refused to hand over their harvests. Alimin and Musso were involved in the incident. The Dutch government accused the leaders of SI Tjokroaminoto and Sosrokardono of treason resulting in their imprisonment. Alimin and Musso was also imprisoned for three years but for lying to the court. After the incident, in 1920, the members of SI decreased significantly, they nearly dissolved the organization, prevented only by Alimin's and Tjokroaminoto's efforts. Alimin, Musso, and Sosrokardono tried to continue the publication of Oetoesan Hindia of SI but it was only short lived.

In 1920, the PKI members were questioning Alimin's loyalty since they thought he was closer to Insulinde than the party, in addition of his siding with SI in a Yogyakarta-Semarang conflict.

Alimin travelled from Batavia to Surakarta to give speech representing PKI central leadership in front of members of newly created Sarekat Rakyat Surakarta branch on 22 November 1923.

In April 1924, Alimin started to grow closer to the Communists by giving speech in a congress of Sarekat Rakyat. Later he attended several meetings of the Communists making SI people wary about his ideologies. Later in late June 1924, he travelled to Canton, China, representing PKI at Transport Workers of the Pacific, a conference sponsored by Comintern.

On a PKI congress in Kotagede, Yogyakarta, on 11-15 December 1924, Alimin was appointed one of commissioners together with Aliarcham, becoming PKI central committee.

On 19 July 1925 Alimin attended Chinese public demonstration enticing public to support Chinese revolutionary movement.

Alimin planned to overthrowing Dutch colonial rule in Indonesia by orchestrating rebellion. He traveled to Singapore to seek approval by Tan Malaka and to Moscow to seek approval by Comintern. The plan was not approved in both occurrences but he still insisted on carrying it out. On 25 Desember 1925, Alimin organized a meeting in Prambanan with the goal of overthrowing Dutch colonial rule in Indonesia. The meeting was attended by several Partai Komunis Indonesia (PKI; Communist Party of Indonesia) leaders such as Sardjono, Budisutjitro (or Budi Sucipto), and Musso. The plan agreed was to stage an uprising that began with a workers’ strike that escalated into armed action in July 1925.

Tan Malaka invited Alimin to stay with him in Manila. When Alimin arrived, instead of staying, he sought approval to launch an uprising. Tan Malaka rejected the idea, arguing that PKI members lacked discipline and the populace was unprepared. He documented his objections in a letter intended for PKI branches in Singapore, Java, and Sumatra.

Upon reaching Singapore, Alimin concealed the document. The party later decided to send Alimin and Musso to Moscow to seek Stalin’s endorsement. On 16 March 1926, Alimin departed for Canton en route to Moscow. That same day, he wrote to Tan Malaka, informing him that the Singapore branch of the PKI had rejected Tan Malaka’s position. When Alimin and Musso arrived in Moscow, Stalin also rejected their plan. Alimin and Musso stayed for three months in Moscow, where they received anti-Trotskyist political education at the Lenin School before departing to Indonesia in October 1926.

In mid December 1926, Alimin and Musso were in Malaya arriving from Canton. On 15 December they arrived in Singapore en route to PKI office in Geylang Serai. On 18 December 1926, Alimin and Musso were arrested by British police in Singapore. On 3 March 1927, the Singapore court of the Federated Malay States (FMS) ruled not to extradite Alimin and Musso to the Dutch East Indies. On 19 March 1927, they were released on the condition that they leave Singapore within a week. On 22 March, they were arrested again for attempting to forge passports. After being released on 26 March, they departed for Hong Kong, en route to Canton.

In April 1927, Alimin and Musso met Subakat, an envoy of Tan Malaka, in Canton. They invited him to join them on a trip to Moscow, but Subakat declined. In May 1927, the three became involved in the Canton uprising. Although they faced the death penalty, the Comintern intervened to secure their release on the condition that they leave Canton. Alimin and Musso decided to go for Moscow while Subakat chose Bangkok.

During the rebellion itself which was happened from 12 November 1926 until early 1927, Alimin was still not in Indonesia. In 1927, Alimin and Musso enrolled at the Lenin school. He never came back to Indonesia until 1946, while traveling to several countries.

Alimin and Musso attended Fourth Comintern Congress in Moscow in 1928. Alimin then spent five and half year attending Lenin University studying communism. His fellow students were Chao En Lai, Thalman, harry Politt, and Ho Chi Minh.

Alimin was sent by the Soviet authorities to meet Tan Malaka in order to establish cooperation. During the conflict between the Kuomintang and the Chinese Communist Party, he managed to meet Tan Malaka in Shanghai, but their efforts failed due to unstable conditions. Following the unrest that ensued, Alimin fled to Vladivostok, where he worked with the Profintern (Red International of Labor Unions).

When Japan invaded China, Alimin was in Yan'an, where he interacted with Mao Zedong, Zhu De (a senior commander of the Chinese Red Army), and Zhou Enlai. During World War II, Alimin assisted the Red Army in its struggle against Japan.

When the news of Indonesia’s proclamation of independence reached him, Alimin was in Chongqing. He immediately sought to return to Indonesia, traveling through Kunming and Hanoi (then part of northern Vietnam). He stayed in Hanoi for two weeks, during which he received assistance from Ho Chi Minh—then president of Indochina—to continue his journey to Bangkok. After a two-week trip, he arrived in Bangkok and then continued by train to Singapore. He arrived in Cirebon in August 1946 and continued the journey to Yogyakarta.

As a result of fourth congress of PKI, Alimin become politbiro member. He oversaw Aidit and Lukman managing party's publication Bintang Merah.

After the Linggarjati Agreement was signed, the PKI rejected it and opposed the premiership of Sutan Sjahrir. Alimin, however, was among those who supported the agreement.

In 1947, when the regulation to expand the membership of the KNIP was issued, the PKI’s representation increased from two seats to thirty-five. Alimin was among the new members, representing Solo.

After Madiun Uprising 1948, Alimin was arrested in Yogyakarta, but he managed to flee from Wirogunan Prison when the Dutch attacked Yogyakarta on 19 December 1948.

On 7 September 1949, the government declared that it would not prosecute the PKI for the Madiun Affair. Alimin was appointed as interim leader to reorganize the party. He restructured the Central Committee secretariat and adopted a strategy favoring a smaller but more militant membership. He also took charge of rebuilding the PKI’s public image. The party’s younger faction opposed this policy, viewing it as too exclusive, as they sought to build a broader mass base.

He supported Hatta's premiership, contrasting Musso who opposed the prime minister. He supported diplomacy between Indonesia and the Netherlands to gain full independence.

As a result of congress held on 7 January 1951, Aidit became chairman of PKI. He ousted old comrades from the party including Alimin for being "weak, elitist and pragmatic". Alimin was appointed chairman of the Central Committee, a largely symbolic position with no real authority, serving mainly as an honorary elder. He was replaced by Sakirman in October 1953.

In 1955 Indonesian legislative election, Alimin was elected as member of Constitutional Assembly. He served from 9 November (or 10 November) 1956 until 5 July 1959 representing PKI.

== Death ==
Alimin died on June 23, 1964.

== Personal life ==
Alimin's mother tongue was Javanese, and he was fluent in French, English, and Dutch, also understood Sundanese.

== Views ==
On a discourse debating state ideology in his time in Constitutional Assembly, Alimin supported Pancasila, while official PKI position interpreting the "Belief in one God", as "religious tolerance and freedom for being neutral on religion".

He categorized socialism under utopian socialism, which was led by Robert Owen, Saint Simon, and Fourier, and scientific socialism, which was formed by Karl Marx. He believed in all means of production to be controlled by the state, proposing Indonesian government to form one or two big corporations as foundation of national economy. He also believed society needs to have a class consciousness, then enduring class struggle in a form of a revolution of workers and proletariat, to have enjoy socialist community. He supported the formation of temporary dictatorship, to remove private ownership and rid the anti-revolutionaries, then after that happened, the state and PKI would disband, forming classless and stateless society.

Alimin had strong conviction of international cooperation and community, believing a communist organization that a newly independent country needed to cooperate with Comintern. He believed that the 1926 PKI rebellion sparked revolutions across the Pacific region.

Alimin's view on nationalism was revolutionary nationalism. He rejected chauvinistic nationalism.

Alimin's view on socialism differed than his mentor Tjokroaminoto in which the former's basis on socialism was Marxism and the latter was Islamic socialism. But Alimin was still not opposed to Islamic value as proven by his speec on 22 November 1923 in front of Sarekat Rakyat members that muslims still would have place in communist society he imagined.

In 1956, Alimin criticized Aidit’s leadership of the PKI as weak and opportunistic, accusing it of deviating from the correct political line, suppressing class consciousness, and turning the party into a bourgeois organization.

== Legacy ==
Alimin was buried in Taman Makam Pahlawan Kalibata (Kalibata Heroes' Cemetery). Alimin was awarded Indonesian National Hero by Sukarno following Presidential Decree no. 163 year 1964 dated 26 June (or 24 June) 1964.

Harian Rakjat praised Alimin as the figure who rebuilt the Indonesian Communist Party (PKI) in the early 1950s.

== Works cited ==
- Febriana, Efantino (2009). Alimin & Tan Malaka: Pahlawan yang Dilupakan (in Indonesian). Yogyakarta: Bio Pustaka. ISBN 978-602-8097-20-8.
- Ingleson, John (1979). Road to Exile: The Indonesian Nationalist Movement, 1927–1934. Singapore: Heinemann Educational Books. ISBN 0708103103. OCLC 5990611.
- Mahadika, Alam (2023). "Gerakan Sosial Politik Alimin bin Prawirodirdjo dalam Partai Komunis Indonesia (PKI)". Journal of Applied Transintegration Paradigm (in Indonesian). 3 (1).
- McVey, Ruth T. (1965). The Rise of Indonesian Communism. Ithaca, New York: Cornell University Press. ISBN 9781501742651. OCLC 651188.
- Shiraishi, Takashi (1990). An Age in Motion: Popular Radicalism in Java, 1912–1926. Ithaca, New York: Cornell University Press. ISBN 9780801421884. OCLC 20014456.
- Noor, Firman; Romli, Lili; Siregar, Sarah Nuraini (2022). "Socialism and Nationalism: A Comparison between the Thought of H.O.S. Tjokroaminoto and Alimin Prawirodirdjo". Akademika: Jurnal Pemikiran Islam. 27 (1): 101–116. doi:10.32332/akademika.v27i1.4797.
