= De Preangerbode =

Extinct Dutch language newspaper

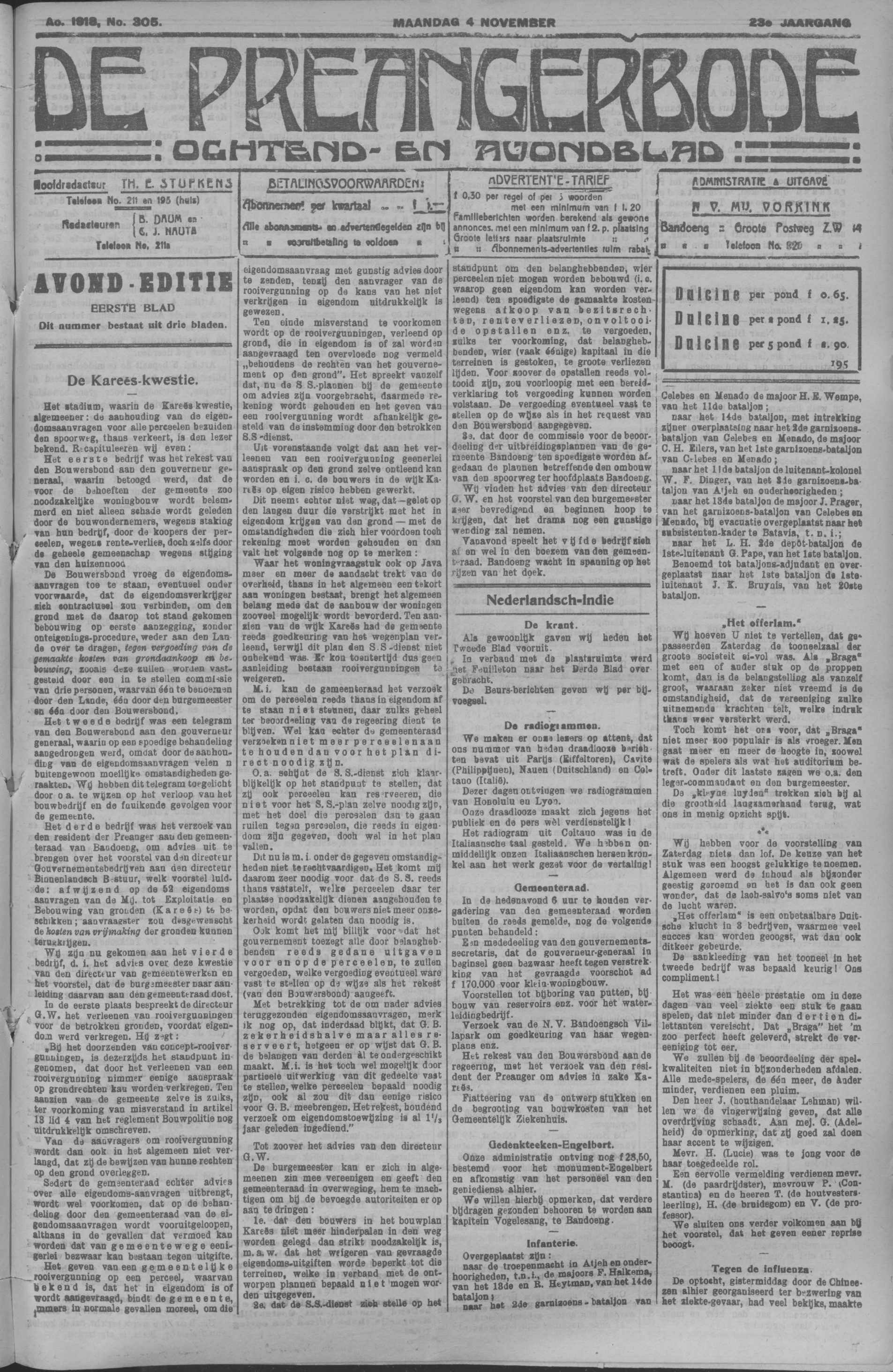
Front page of De Preangerbode from November 4, 1918

De Preangerbode (Dutch: The Parahyangan messenger) was a Dutch language newspaper published in Bandung, Preanger Regencies Residency, Dutch East Indies (later Indonesia) from 1896 to 1957. After 1923 it was renamed Algemeen Indisch Dagblad de Preangerbode (Dutch: Indies-wide Daily Paper, The Parahyangan messenger).

== History ==
The Preangerbode was founded in 1896 in Bandung, with J. De Vries & Co. as the publisher. One of the co-founders was Jan Fabricius, father of the writer Johan Fabricius. He worked with Klaas de Vries in bookselling and book publishing in Bandung during this time. Jan had worked for newspapers in the Netherlands and Batavia before becoming cofounder and first editor of this paper.

Jan Fabricius was diagnosed with liver disease in 1902 and was forced to return to the Netherlands. In 1902 the paper was acquired by the Kolff firm, owner of the Bataviaasch Nieuwsblad. According to Gerard Termorshuizen, historian of Indies newspapers, during this time the paper was mainly of local interest and relied mostly on content from its parent paper the Bataviaasch Nieuwsblad for wider news. During this time it had slightly over one thousand subscribers. Under the editorship of Willem Frederik Marinus van Schaik, who ran the paper from 1904 to 1910, the paper was a mild supporter of the Ethical Policy, but did not involve itself too deeply in politics. After retiring from the Preangerbode van Schaik returned to the Netherlands and became head editor of Leeuwarder Courant and later of the Deventer Dagblad.

The next editor of the newspaper was Theodoor E. Stufkens, who ran it from 1910 to 1921. During his tenure at the newspaper, the first modern nationalist parties arose in the colony, Ernest Douwes Dekker's Indische Party as well as the Sarekat Islam. As with most Dutch newspapers, the Preangerbode was extremely hostile to these movements and Stufkens dedicated himself to slandering them, even published a pseudonymous novel called Meta Mormel. During the First World War, the Preangerbode also gained a reputation as a good source of information from the German side.

In 1913 the Kolff firm sold the paper to the N.V. Maatschappij Vorkink and relocated to a new office on the Groote Postweg in Bandung, and added some new editors including H. Mulder and Bart Daum (son of Paulus Adrianus Daum) and . In 1919 the ownership was restructured again into the N.V. Preangerbode with the previous owner Vorkink remaining in charge. It was around this time that the Indonesian nationalist figure Abdul Muis worked as a proofreader for the paper, before moving onto a more important role in the Malay language press of the Indies.

In 1921, Bart Daum became head editor, a post he held until 1929. He soon shared the duties with another editor, C.A. Crayé, who held his post from 1923 to 1929. By 1923, the newspaper was estimated to have a circulation of six thousand, which grew to seven thousand by 1930.

After 1929 two new editors were appointed: C.W. Wormser (1929 to 1934) and C.J. Nauta (1929 to 1937).

In 1934 A. Goote was appointed editor, a position he only held until the following year. And in 1936 B. Sluimer was appointed to the position, which he held until the outbreak of the war in 1942. The paper printed its final prewar issue on March 2, 1942; it was later refounded during the war.

The postwar editor of the newspaper was J.P. Verhoek, who ran it in the early period of Indonesian independence, from 1950 to 1956. He resigned in 1956 after a disagreement with the management, but he stayed in Indonesia working De Volkskrant and other newspapers until finally returning to the Netherlands in 1958.

De Preangerbode closed along with all other Dutch-language press in Indonesia as a result of the 1 December 1957 regulation which prohibited them as a punishment for the Dutch position in the West New Guinea dispute. Currently the Indonesian newspaper Pikiran Rakyat occupies the former building of the Preangerbode on the Grote Postweg in Bandung, which is now called Jalan Asia-Afrika.
