= Semaun =

Indonesian politician

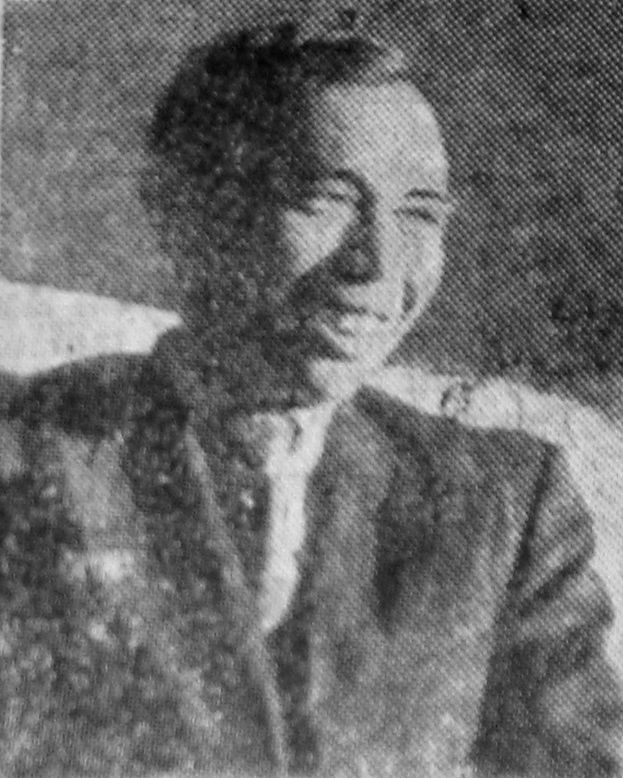
- Semaun c. 1955
- Born: 1899; Curahmalang, Sumobito, Jombang, East Java, Dutch East Indies
- Died: 7 April 1971 (aged 71–72); Jakarta, Indonesia
- Burial place: Gununggansir Public Cemetery, Beji, Pasuruan, East Java, Indonesia
- Occupations: General Secretary of the Communist Party of Indonesia; Politician
- Political party: Sarekat Islam; Communist Party of Indonesia; Murba Party

Semaun (1899–1971), also spelled Semaoen, was the first chairman of the Communist Party of Indonesia (PKI) and was a leader of the Semarang branch of the Sarekat Islam.

== Early life ==
Semaun was born in 1899 in Curahmalang, Jombang, East Java. Semaoen was the son of Prawiroatmodjo, a bricklayer in the railway ministry. Although not the son of a rich man, Semaoen managed to get into the Tweede Klas school (a second-class native school) and obtained additional education in Dutch by attending a kind of afternoon course. After completing primary school, he was unable to continue to higher education. Therefore, he worked at the Staatsspoor (SS) Surabaya as a small clerk.

== Politics ==
His emergence on the political stage of the movement began at the age of 14. At that time, in 1914, he joined the Sarekat Islam (SI) afdeeling Surabaya. A year later, in 1915, he met Sneevliet and was invited to join the Indische Sociaal-Democratische Vereeniging, the social democratic organisation of the Dutch East Indies. Thus by the age of sixteen, he was elected as one of the first Indonesian members of the Union of Train and Tramway Personnel (VSTP), soon quitting his job as a railway worker to become a trade union activist full-time. At the same time, he was elected vice-chairman of the Surabaya office of the Indies Social Democratic Association (ISDV), which was to become the Indonesian Communist Party or PKI. A good command of the Dutch language, especially in reading and listening, his interest in continuing to expand his knowledge by studying on his own, and a fairly close relationship with Sneevliet, were important factors why Semaoen was able to occupy important positions in both Dutch organisations.

In Semarang, He left his job at Staatsspoor in 1916 in line with his move to Semarang because he was appointed as a salaried VSTP propagandist. he also became editor of the Malay-language VSTP newspaper, and Sinar Djawa-Sinar Hindia, the newspaper of Sarekat Islam in Semarang. Semaoen was the youngest figure in the organisation. In his teens, he was known as a reliable and intelligent journalist. He also had an eye that was often used as a powerful weapon in attacking colonial policies.

In 1918 he also became a member of the leadership council at Sarekat Islam (SI), then the dominant nationalist political organization in the Dutch East Indies. As Chairman of SI Semarang, Semaoen was heavily involved with labour strikes. The largest and most successful strike in early 1918 was launched by 300 workers in the furniture industry. In 1920, there was another massive strike among print industry workers involving SI Semarang. This strike succeeded in forcing employers to increase workers' wages by 20 per cent and food allowances by 10 per cent.

On 23 May 1920, the Communist Party of Indonesia (originally the Partai Komunis Hindia, changed to 'Indonesia' a few months later) was founded after the deportation of the Dutch founders of the ISDV. Semaun became its first chairman. The PKI initially was a part of Sarekat Islam, but political differences over the role of class struggle and of Islam in nationalism between Semaun's PKI and the rest of SI led to an organizational split by October. At the end of that year he left Indonesia for Moscow, and Tan Malaka replaced him as chairman. Upon his return in May 1922, he regained the chairmanship and tried, with limited success, to restore PKI influence over the sprawling SI organization. Together with Alimin and Darsono, Semaoen realised Sneevliet's ideals to enlarge and strengthen the communist movement in the Dutch East Indies. The attitude and principles of communism adopted by Semaoen made his relationship with other SI members tenuous. On 23 May 1920, after deporting the initial ISDV cadres, Semaoen changed the ISDV to the Indies Communist Party. Seven months later, the name was changed to the Indonesian Communist Party with Semaoen as its first chairman. The PKI was originally part of Sarekat Islam, but differences in understanding led the two major forces in SI to split in October 1921. At the end of that year he left Indonesia for Moscow, and Tan Malaka succeeded him as Chairman. After returning to Indonesia in May 1922, he regained the position of Chairman and tried to regain influence in the SI but was unsuccessful.

== Exile ==
In 1923 VSTP, the railway union, organized a general strike. It was soon crushed by the Dutch government, and Semaun was exiled from the Indies. He returned to the Soviet Union, where he was to remain for more than thirty years. He remained involved as a nationalist activist on a limited basis, speaking a few times to Perhimpunan Indonesia, a Netherlands-based organization of Indonesian students. He also studied at the Communist University of the Toilers of the East for a time. He travelled extensively in Europe, and played a role in leadership in Tajikistan in the Soviet era. He wrote a novel, Hikayat Kadirun, which combined communist and Islamic ideals, and produced a number of pamphlets and newspaper articles.

Upon his return to Indonesia after its independence, Semaun moved to Jakarta, where from 1959 to 1961 he served on a government advisory board. He was rejected by the new leadership of the PKI, and was affiliated to the Murba Party (Proletarian Party), which was opposed to the PKI. Spared from the aftermath of the 30 September Movement, he taught economics at Universitas Padjadjaran in Bandung. He died in Jakarta in 1971.
