= Sukarno–Malaka debate =

1944 political debate in Bayah, Indonesia

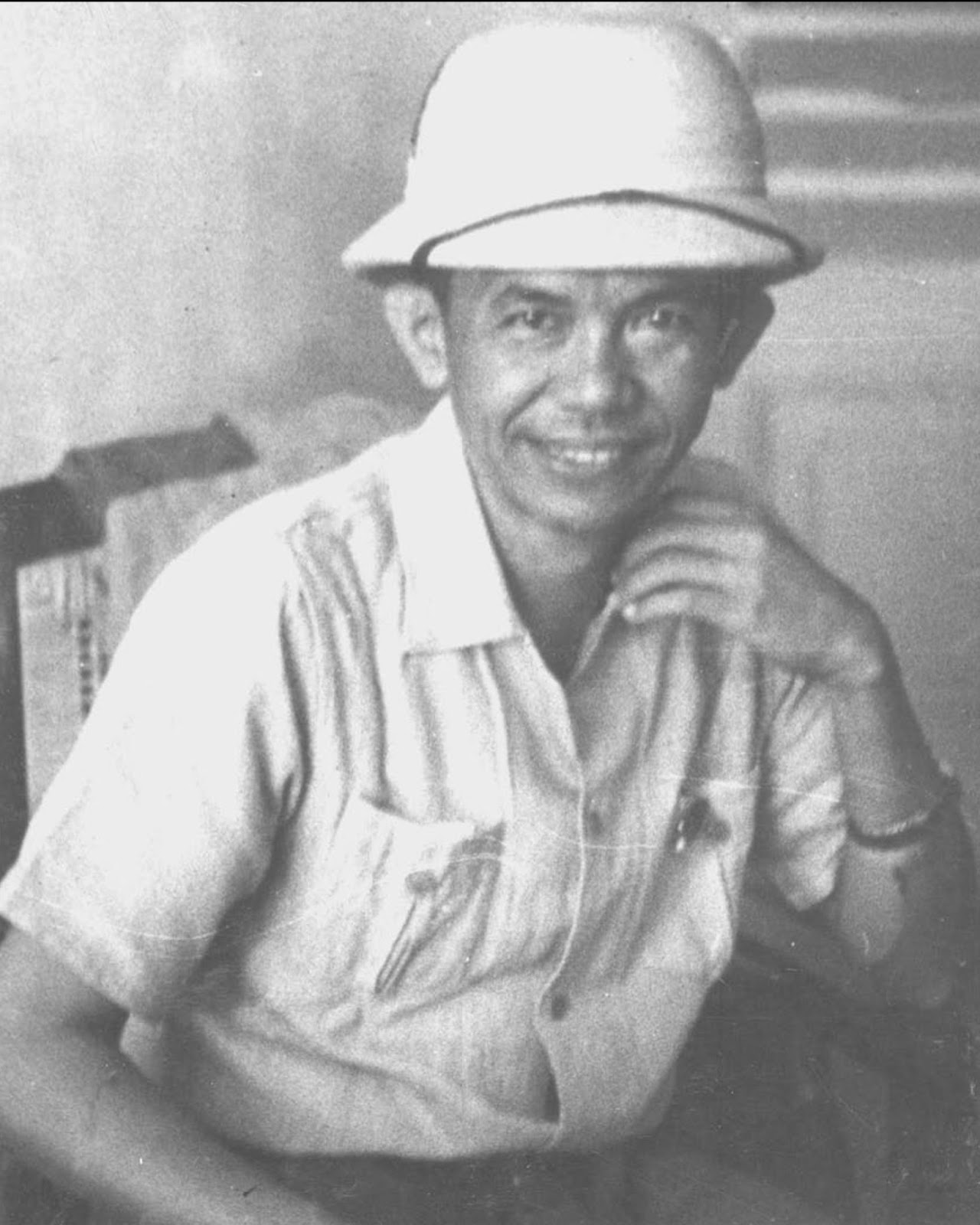
Tan Malaka, disguised as a worker.

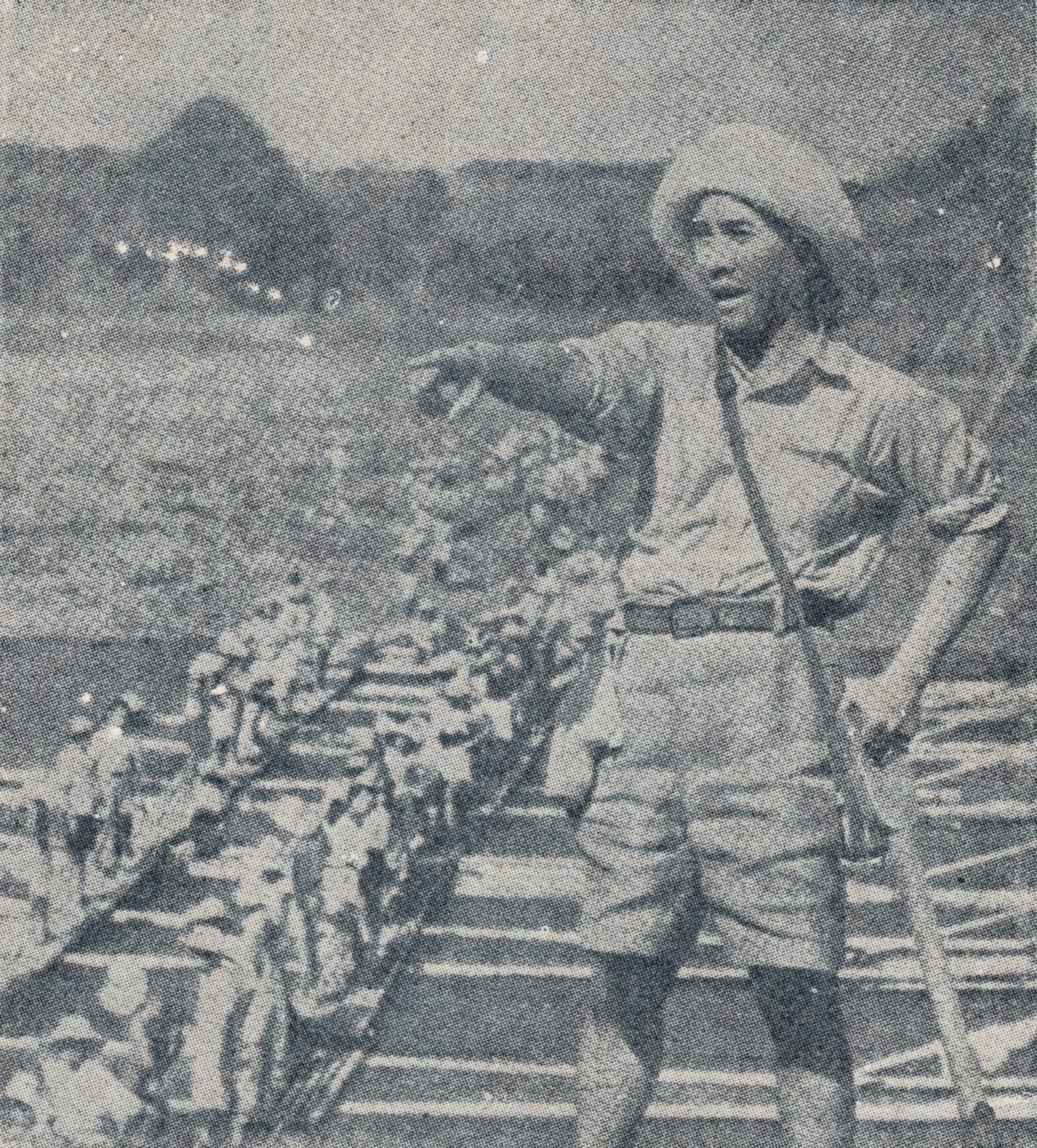
Sukarno, ordering forced laborers (rōmusha).

The Sukarno–Tan Malaka debate was a political exchange between Indonesian nationalist leaders Sukarno, the first president of Indonesia, and Tan Malaka, as the founding father of Indonesia. The debate happened at Bayah, Lebak Regency in Banten, during the Japanese occupation of the Dutch East Indies in September 1944. The exchange between Sukarno and Tan Malaka concerned the relationship between Indonesian independence and cooperation with Japan.

The encounter occurred after Sukarno delivered a speech to the rōmusha at the Bayah coal-mining complex, where he called for increased production in support of the Japanese war effort. Tan Malaka, who was then living clandestinely, worked in Bayah as a rōmusha clerk under the name "Iljas Hoessein". He coincidentally attended the event and questioned Sukarno during the public question-and-answer session that followed.

== Background ==
After witnessing the Fall of Singapore, Tan Malaka secretly returned to Indonesia. Tan Malaka lived under assumed identities and spent time in Jakarta while writing works, including his magnum opus, Madilog. His living expenses were purely bore from the time he was working in Singapore. His financial situation eventually forced him to look for employment.He himself wanted to leave Jakarta but did not know where he might find work. According to his autobiography, Dari Penjara ke Penjara, he once read a newspaper listing a job opportunity at a Japanese-operated coal mine at Bayah, South Banten was looking for about thirty Indonesian employees. He initially dismissed it, as the paper listed "prominent people only."

Spending time at the library of the Royal Batavian Society of Arts and Sciences (now as the Gedung Arca library), he coincidentally encountered the scholar Poerbatjaraka, who requested if anyone in the library was available to translate a difficult English word. After volunteering and helping Poerbatjaraka, Malaka was given advice to approach the Japanese-controlled Department of Social Affairs. He took an interview the next day. To get the job, he described himself under a pseudonym "Iljas Hoessein", an Indonesian who had worked as a clerk for a firm in Singapore. To his delight, even without a diploma and competing against 50 people, he was recruited. He would thus be transported 5‒6 hours by truck to Rangkasbitung, then Malingping, onto Bayah.

Bayah, on Banten's isolated southern coast, held exceptional importance because of its coal deposits. During this time, Japanese exploitation was organised through the Bayah Kozan, a concern connected with Sumitomo Group, with output subordinated to Japanese military requirements. The mine was integrated into a larger programme centred on the Saketi–Bayah railway, constructed to connect the southern Banten mining district with the existing railway system. Both the railway and the mining operation depended heavily on mobilised labour. Labourers were recruited through the rōmusha system via compulsion, propaganda, quotas and nominal contracts; poorer villagers bore a disproportionate burden; malnutrition, disease, brutal treatment and separation from families were recurrent features. In Banten alone, there were severe rice requisitioning in Banten and a general collapse in health and subsistence conditions during 1944–1945. In his tract Rencana Ekonomi Berjuang (1945), Malaka chose the Bayah coal mine as an example of what he called, in substance, "capitalism reduced to overt plunder under the Japanese 'Greater East Asia Co-Prosperity Sphere'".

After arriving in June 1943, Malaka first concern was finding accommodation so he could sleep well. First renting a room at a local village, then sleeping in a makeshift bambo hut. Though he would soon realise the appalling conditions the workers had toiled. Though selected as a clerk, he was acting as a warehouse worker and his job being to "to impose order on the many 'wandering' goods in the dark, hot warehouse, where items were often left to rot." His job were to lift crates and does note keeping with said crates.

During his time at Bayah often took volunteer positions to alleviate the hardships of the laborers. He would set up a soup kitchen, a vegetable garden, a hospital, a sports club, an orchestra, and a drama club. He and his office organised medical examinations, tally deaths, relay said information to the families, and collected information on workers' welfare at the site. He also advised workers on health matters and discouraged them from escaping, warning that they would die of starvation before reaching home. He would also become the temporary deputy chairman of the Soldiers' Assistance Agency (BPP). Using this position he would donated a sum of donations in and around the villages of the Bayah area. He would also sacrifice his salary to buy food for forced labourers, which often lacked so. He would often report the housing, clothing, food, and medical care conditions of the workers to the Japanese officers in attempt to reduce the number of deaths; which he would list the amount of deaths that happened at the site, at most recorded about 400‒500 deaths each month. His efforts would succeed in the reduction of deaths and efficiency of work.

== Debate ==
Sukarno's speech at Bayah (at 2:24) in a Japanese propaganda newsreel; his subsequent debate with Tan Malaka was cut from the footage, September 1944.

External media
- Reconstruction of the meeting (in Indonesian)

In September 1944, Sukarno and Mohammad Hatta would arrive to survey the site. During this time, Sukarno led officials, intellectuals, and other volunteers in a week-long symbolic propaganda campaign of a period of service as the rōmusha, organized by the Jawa Hokokai as part of a campaign to encourage the mobilization of forced labourers. Days earlier, the propaganda campaign led to 500 of the volunteers to be sent to Japanese-occupied Burma on 3 September 1944 to build the Burma Railway, with Sukarno once remarking that this was to "show the Japanese that the Javanese people are ready to live and die with Dai Nippon." Moving to Bayah, Sukarno would wore a brightly colored shirt and a round hat with the number 970 on it as a way to act like a rōmusha. Among Sukarno's entourage, he would bring reporters, photographers, the Gunseikan, and Civil Authorities. They campaigned as propaganda film actors paid by the Japanese film studio.

Arriving at Bayah, Tan Malaka (still under the pseudonym "Iljas Hoessein") would first encounter to meet Sukarno by serving him a drink. Tan Makaka was part of the welcoming committee to greet Sukarno and Hatta. Previously in his youth, Sukarno had admired and read Tan Malaka's book Naar de Republiek Indonesia in 1925, whilst Malaka was in Canton as the Comintern representative for Southeast Asia, working alongside Mikhail Borodin and Ho Chi Minh. Naar de Republiek Indonesia, as the first articulation of the concept of an Indonesian nation-state, earned Tan Malaka the moniker "Father of the Republic of Indonesia" and would greatly influence Sukarno's revolutionary rhetoric, which later helped to set the tone for the movement against Dutch colonial rule. Sukarno would also read Tan Malaka's Massa Actie in 1926. However, both Naar de Republiek Indonesia and Massa Actie had been published under pseudonyms, leaving Sukarno unable to identify their author. According to Tan Malaka's autobiography, using his disguise, he was honoured and was initially "very happy to meet him." Because his own clothes were worn and patched, a colleague even lent him a shirt and tie so that he could appear presentable when receiving the two leaders. After so, during his tour around Bayah, Sukarno would make a speech.

In the midst of hearing Sukarno's speech, Tan Malaka would quickly dismiss it as being "not much different from the dozens of speeches he had delivered at mass rallies and over the radio." He would argue that much of Sukarno's central message conformed to Japanese propaganda; that Indonesians were expected to support "elder-brother" Japan against the Allies and await independence after a Japanese victory. The moderator, Sukarjo Wiryopranoto, then invited members of the gathering to ask questions. While preparing and picking cakes and drinks for the attending guests, Malaka overheard several questioners receiving mocking, sarcastic responses given towards the forced laborers. According to his biography, he became irritated by the atmosphere, particularly after Sukarjo mocked and suggested that the Son-chō (district head) of Bayah should attend a course for Pangreh Praja. Unaccepting to the treatment given, Malaka then put aside the refreshments and entered the discussion.

Tan Malaka would first ask whether it would be more accurate to say that Indonesian independence would better guarantee Japan's final victory. With a dismissive tone, Sukarno argued that Indonesians should accumulate jasa (service) toward Dai Nippon, after which Japan would grant independence. Sukarno also argued that if independence were granted immediately, Indonesians would still have to struggle to defend it. Sukarno's response had made Tan Malaka believe that his interpretation of independence differs from that of Sukarno. According to University of Indonesia historian Peter Kasenda, Sukarno chose to cooperate with Japan as he regarded the Japanese as offering greater prospects for Indonesian independence than the Dutch. Sukarno also had admired Japan's rapid defeat of the Netherlands and viewed the Japanese occupation of Indonesia as a potential path toward independence. Malaka thus immediately rejected Sukarno's conclusion. Tan Malaka argued that even as Indonesia had already gained independence at the time, it already necessitated the need for of fighting. And that, however, if the fight for independence was founded on one's own efforts rather than promises from other parties, it would be carried out with greater zeal. Tan Malaka claims that the presence of actual rights that were already in place strengthened the will to defend and that the Indonesian people will fight valiantly to protect and uphold Indonesia's independence day.

Tan Malaka, intent on proving his version of independence to Sukarno, used the analogy of a supposedly cowardly village herdsman who "killed a tiger with a machete after the animal attacked his buffalo." Malaka argued that the herdsman's courage arose because he was defending something that already belonged to him. He applied the analogy to Indonesian independence and argued that Indonesians would fight more vigorously if independence were already in their possession rather than merely promised by Japan. Without pause, Malaka followed such analogy by citing Edward Gibbon's The Decline and Fall of the Roman Empire. He argued that Rome's reliance on slave labour contributed to declining production because he believed that "enslaved workers had little personal interest in the livestock, tools, or products with which they worked." According to Malaka, the resulting decline in production was accompanied by a weakening of the state's defence.

Irritated, Sukarno then stood, adjusted his clothes, and looked from side to side. Seeing his face, Tan Malaka interpreted Sukarno's reaction as suggesting that he was unaccustomed to being challenged during his speaking tours across Java, particularly by someone from a remote village such as Bayah. To assert his authority and finality of his position, Sukarno would then loudly stated that: "If Dai Nippon now also gives me independence, then I will not accept it."

Dissatisfied of Sukarno's answer, Malaka attempted for a rebuttal for a longer discussion, but was stopped by an Indonesian rōmusha supervisor sympathetic to the Japanese management, who stated, "I am compelled not to permit Mr. Hussein to speak any further." To historian Kenichi Gotō, it was probable that Sukarno's final remark was intended to convey that he believed the time was not yet ripe for immediate independence. However, Tan Malaka would attack Sukarno for the comment which held "serious implications not to be overlooked."

During his stay at Bayah Sukarno lived in the same bamboo huts as the rōmusha, ate the same meals, and took part in similar manual labour, including mining and carrying sandbags, as a demonstration of the Japanese-promoted the "working warrior". Unlike the rōmusha, however, Sukarno, Hatta, and their entourage were able to leave Bayah and return to Jakarta about a week later.

== Aftermath ==
In the aftermath of the debate, Tan Malaka became increasingly disillusioned with the Center of the People's Power (Putera) and Hōkōkai formulated by Sukarno, which in his view were "[...] successively established and dissolved." Moreso that Putera and Indonesian nationalists leaders became increasingly associated among the public with the organisations for serving as important sources of support for the mobilisation of forced labour and other programmes initiated by the Japanese occupation forces. Using his time as a rōmusha clerk, Tan Malaka would often use the opportunity to head to work sites secretly and mingled with the forced laborers to see the conditions of the rōmusha. Such was done as a way to observe and learn the political, economic, social, and cultural conditions of the working class under governance. There, he would conclude;

"Here too, we were able to put our sense of responsibility into practice toward a group of Indonesians who were victims of Japanese militarism and victims of the acquiescence and propaganda of their own leaders."

Dutch historian Harry A. Poeze argues that, although the visit intended to be a propaganda stint in support of the rōmusha programme, the Bayah debate "revealed Sukarno's political position to the youth activists (pemuda) and officials." In Poeze's account of Tan Malaka's criticism, Sukarno's speeches were then on seen as demoralising the Indonesian people, while his support for the Japanese rōmusha programme, which caused millions of deaths, was portrayed by many as "contributing to the destruction of the Indonesian people." The treatment of the rōmusha present during Sukarno's visit, and later by the edited propaganda film, provoked strong reactions among many Indonesians, particularly nationalist activists who sought an end to colonial rule. For such critics, Sukarno's participation in the campaign appeared deeply contradictory, as deduced by Dzikri of Tirto.id, "[...] the commander-in-chief who led the steep road to independence actually 'sold out' his people to torture and suffering for free." Historian Henk Schulte Nordholt remarked that on the aftermath of the debate, resentment over the rōmusha system was directed "against not only Sukarno but especially the village chiefs and Javanese administrators who had sent them to this hell."

Czech historian Rudolf Mrázek argues that Sukarno was "guilty of an elitist, kerajaan-like attitudes towards the Indonesian common people," which stood in sharp contrast to Tan Malaka's populist conception of kerakyatan. He argued that such contrast was especially pronounced at Bayah, wherein Sukarno represented the political elite that mobilized the population in support of the occupation policies enacted by Japan. And that on Sukarno's visit and speech, Mrazek would write, "whil[st] Sukarno was hypnotizing the masses, Tan Malaka suffered together with them, organizing a public kitchen, a field hospital, and self-supporting cooperatives for them, arranging funerals and entertainment for them, and preparing them for Independence."

On a segment to Sukarno in Thesis (1946), Tan Malaka would condemn Indonesian leaders who supported Japanese "claims of righteousness" and criticise the mobilisation of heiho and millions of rōmusha for Japanese military purposes. He would argue that independence had to be won through the revolutionary strength of the Indonesian people themselves, rather than through promises or concessions from imperialist or fascist powers. He did not reject diplomacy outright, but opposed compromises that made Indonesian independence and sovereignty subjects of negotiation. This position increasingly made Tan Malaka in opposition to the diplomatic strategy pursued by the First Sjahrir Cabinet. By early 1946, a broad opposition coalition formed around Tan Malaka and his programme of "100% independence" in the form of the Persatuan Perjuangan alongside Sudirman, then as the first commander-in-chief of the Indonesian armed forces. The political conflict between the government and this opposition contributed to the wider tensions that culminated in the 3 July Affair, although Tan Malaka had been imprisoned since March and his direct responsibility for the affair remains disputed.

=== Post-war ===
In his autobiography, Sukarno would comment on his actions at Bayah stating,

"In reality, it was I—Soekarno—who sent them away to work. Yes, I was the one. I ordered them to sail toward their deaths. Yes, yes, yes, yes, I was the one. I made statements in support of the mobilization of romusha [forced laborers], [...] And it was I who gave them to the Japanese. Sounds terrible, doesn't it? They tell me the people won't like to read this — is that right? Well, I do not blame them. Nobody likes the ugly truth."
