= Tan Malaka =

Indonesian communist philosopher, activist, and national hero (1897–1949)

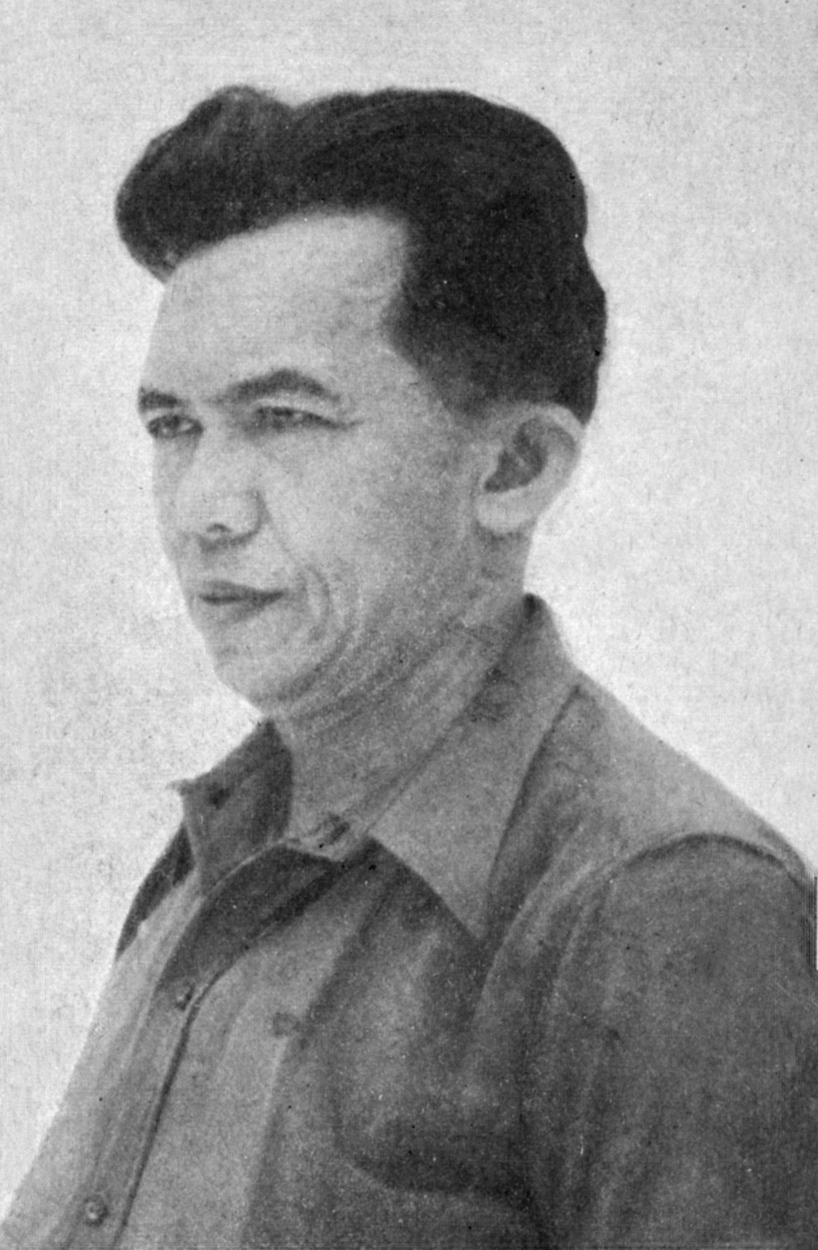
- Ibrahim Simabua Sutan Malaka, portrait as published in his autobiography
- Born: Ibrahim; 2 June 1897; Limapuluh Koto, Dutch East Indies
- Died: 21 February 1949 (aged 51); Kediri, Indonesia
- Cause of death: Execution by firing squad
- Other name: 23 aliases (Note: Syaifudin (2012, p. 63) wrote that Tan Malaka used 23 aliases. Malaka used Elias Fuentes, Esahislau Rivera, and Alisio Rivera in the Philippines. While in Singapore he used Hasan Gozali. Ossorio was used when he was in Shanghai. Tan Min Sion when he was in Burma. While in Hong Kong he used 13 different names, one of them was Ong Song Lee. In other part of China he used Cheung Kun Tat and Howard Lee. While in Indonesia he used Dasuki, Ramli Hussein, and Ilyas Husein.)
- Awards: National Hero of Indonesia

Philosophical work
- Era: Modern philosophy: 20th-century philosophy
- Region: Eastern philosophy: Indonesian philosophy
- Main interests: Epistemology, Socialism, Marxism, National Marxism, Pan-Islamism
- Notable ideas: Indonesia, Madilog, 100% independent Indonesia, Mystical logic

Ibrahim Simabua Datuak Sutan Malaka (2 June 1897 – 21 February 1949), also known as Tan Malaka, was an Indonesian statesman, teacher, Marxist, and philosopher who was the founder of Struggle Union (Persatuan Perjuangan) and the Murba Party. He is also known as the Indonesian fighter, national hero, an independent guerrilla, and a spy.

In his youth, Tan Malaka was a member of Sarekat Islam and the ISDV. In 1922, he became the first Dutch immigrant to run in a Dutch General election. He also served as the principal Comintern agent for Southeast Asia, standing as a peer to Ho Chi Minh and Sun Yat-sen. He also helped shape the nationalist movement in Malaya and the Philippines by mentoring figures such as Ibrahim Yaacob and Crisanto Evangelista. He is also known for being the first person to conceptualize the Indonesian nation-state. His writings would also inspire the lyrics for "Indonesia Raya" and Sukarno's revolutionary movement.

Among Indonesians, he has been referred to as the "Father of the Republic of Indonesia" (Indonesian: Bapak Republik Indonesia), a designation first used by Muhammad Yamin, and later by Tempo. Due to his clandestine past, he is also monikered as "The Scarlet Pimpernel" (Indonesian: Patjar Merah).

== Early life ==
=== Family and childhood ===
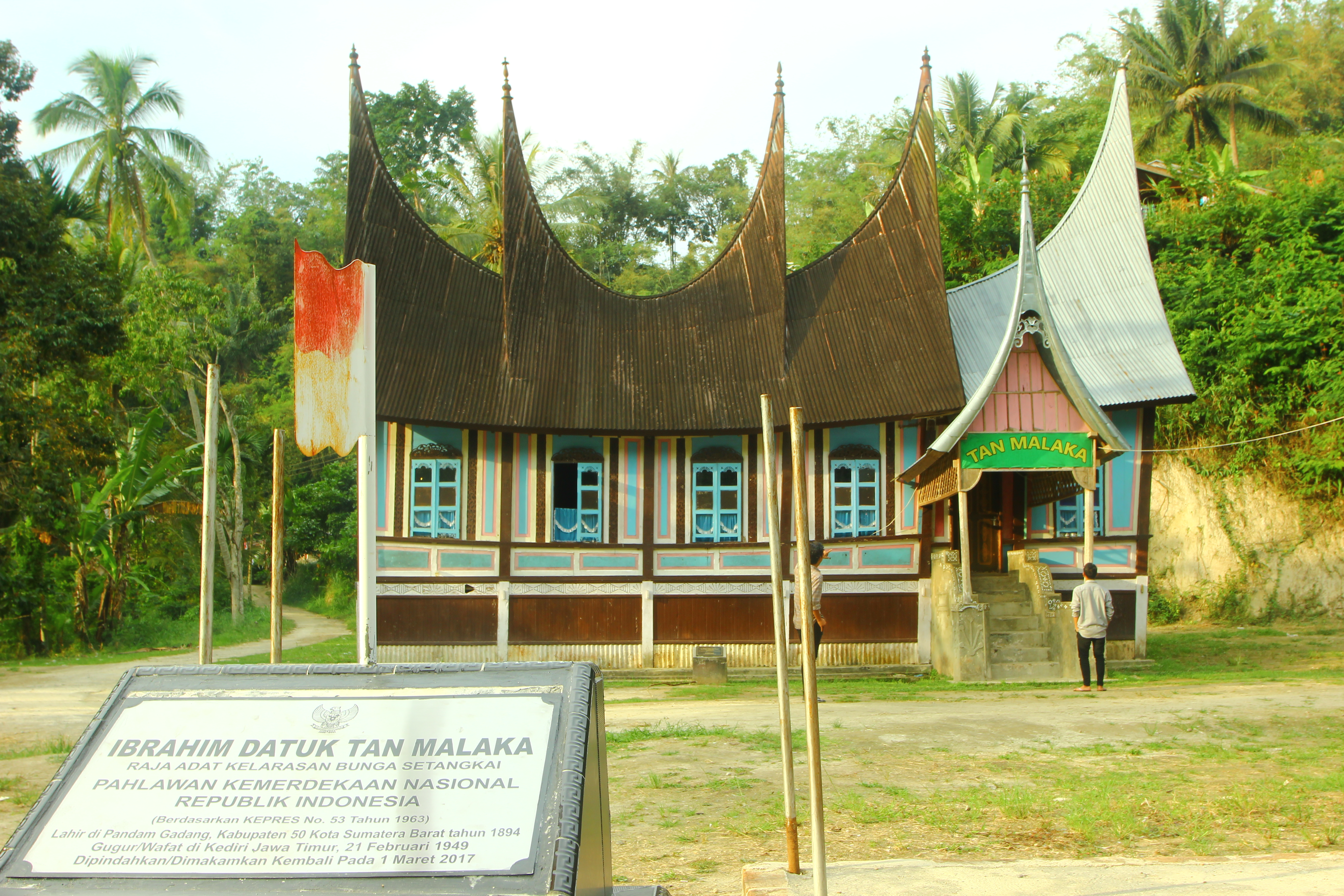
Tan Malaka's childhood home, which has now become a museum

Tan Malaka's full name was Ibrahim Simabua gala Datuak Sutan Malaka. (Note: The word gala in his title, "gala Datuak Sutan Malaka" implied that he was a pangulu andiko, or formal head of a sabuah parui (a community of descendants of a maternal ancestor connected with a particular maternal house, an important component of the Minangkabau social structure).) His given name was Ibrahim, but he was known both as a child and as an adult as Tan Malaka, an honorary and semi-aristocratic name, he inherited from his mother's aristocratic background. He was born in present-day Nagari Pandam Gadang, Suliki, Lima Puluh Kota Regency, West Sumatra, which was then under the rule of the Dutch East Indies. His date of birth in unclear, and varies from source to source, but is likely sometime between 1894 and 1897. (Note: In Djamaludin Tamin's Kematian Tan Malaka ("Death of Tan Malaka"), and Helen Jarvis' Tan Malaka: Revolutionary or Renegade?, his date of birth is listed in 1896, with Tamin putting his exact date of birth as falling on 2 June 1896. Other sources also put a different date for his birth, Wasid Suwarto puts the date on 14 October 1897, while Harry Poeze states that Malaka was born around 1894.)

His father was Haji Muhammad Rasad Caniago, an agricultural employee, and his mother was Rangkayo Sinah Simabua, a daughter of a respected figure in the village. As a child, Tan Malaka lived with his parents in Suliki, and studied religious knowledge and trained in the pencak silat martial arts. In 1908, Tan Malaka attended the Kweekschool, a state teacher's school, at Fort de Kock. At the Kweekschool, Tan Malaka studied the Dutch language and became a skilled football player. According to his teacher, G. H. Horensma, although Malaka was sometimes disobedient, he was an excellent student. He graduated in 1913, and returned to his village. His return would be ceremonialized by the conferment on him of a high adat title of datuk and the offer of a fiancée. However, he only accepted the title. He succeeded in getting money from the village to continue his education abroad, and he sailed for Rotterdam that same year.

=== Time in the Netherlands ===
Arriving at the Netherlands, Tan Malaka initially experienced a culture shock. There, he heavily underestimated the North European climate. As a consequence, he was infected with pleuritis in early 1914, and he did not completely recover until 1915. During his time in Europe, he developed an interest in the history of revolutions, as well as in the theory of revolution as a means of transforming society. His first inspiration on the subject came from the book De Fransche Revolutie, which was originally given to him by G. H. Horensma. The book was a Dutch translation of a book by the German historian, author, journalist, and social democratic politician Wilhelm Blos, which concerned the French Revolution and the historical events in France from 1789 until 1804. After the Russian Revolution of October 1917, Tan Malaka became increasingly interested in communism, socialism and reformist socialism. Beginning to read the works of Karl Marx, Friedrich Engels, and Vladimir Lenin.

He also began reading the works of Friedrich Nietzsche, who became one of his early political role models. During this time, Tan Malaka grew to dislike Dutch culture. Instead, he was more impressed at the cultures of Germany and the United States. He even enlisted for the German Army, but was rebuffed, as the army did not accept foreigners at the time. In the Netherlands, he met Henk Sneevliet, one of the founders of the Indische Sociaal-Democratische Vereeniging (ISDV), the precursor to the Communist Party of Indonesia (PKI). Tan Malaka also became interested in the Sociaal-Democratische Onderwijzers Vereeniging (Association of Democrat Social Teachers) during this time. In November 1919, Tan Malaka graduated, and received his hulpacte diploma. (Note: Tan Malaka had actually wanted to receive the hoofdacte diploma, which was a higher diploma than the one he had received. However, his poor health prevented him from continuing further education.)

== Early struggle ==
=== Teaching and journalism ===
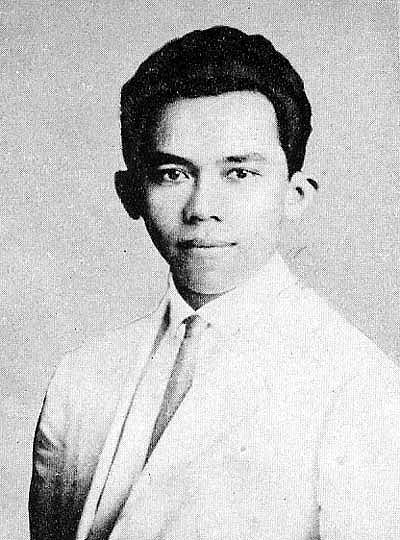
Portrait of Tan Malaka, c. 1920s

Following his graduation, he left the Netherlands and returned to his village. He accepted a job offer by Dr. C. W. Janssen to teach the children of the tea plantation coolies, at Sanembah, Tanjung Morawa, Deli, East Sumatra. He went there in December 1919, but began teaching only in January 1920. He produced subversive propaganda for the coolies, known as the Deli Spoor, and began learning of the deterioration of the indigenous people that had occurred. In addition to teaching, he made a contact with ISDV, and wrote some works for the press. As a journalist, he wrote on the striking differences in wealth between capitalists and workers, in one of his earliest works, the "Land of Paupers"; which was included in a March 1920 issue of Het Vrije Woord. Tan Malaka also wrote on the suffering of the coolies in the Sumatera Post.

Tan Malaka went to Batavia (now Jakarta) when his old teacher, G. H. Horensma, offered him a job as a teacher; however, Tan Malaka rejected the offer. As he wanted to establish his own school; to which his old teacher accepted the reason and supported him. In 1921, Tan Malaka was elected to the Volksraad as member of the Left-wing grouping, but resigned on 23 February 1921. He subsequently left Batavia and arrived at Yogyakarta in early March 1921, and stayed as the house of Sutopo, a former leader of Budi Utomo. There, he wrote a proposal for a grammar school. In Yogyakarta, he participated in the Sarekat Islam organization's 5th congress and met with a number of prominent Islamic figures, including H.O.S. Tjokroaminoto, Agus Salim, Darsono, and Semaun. The congress discussed the topic of double membership of both the Sarekat Islam and the Communist Party (PKI). Agus Salim, and another figure, Abdul Muis, forbade it, while Semaun and Darsono were both PKI members.

=== Involvement with the PKI ===
Sarekat Islam was split as a result, forming the Sarekat Islam Putih (White Sarekat Islam), led by Tjokroaminoto, and the Sarekat Islam Merah (Red Sarekat Islam), led by Semaun and based in Semarang. After the congress, Tan Malaka was asked by Semaun to go to Semarang to join PKI. He accepted the offer, and went to Semarang. Arriving in Semarang, he became ill. A month later, he had returned to health, and participated in a meeting with fellow Sarekat Islam Semarang members. The meeting concluded that a rival to the government-administered schools were needed. This led to the creation of a new school, named the Sekolah Sarekat Islam ("Sarekat Islam School"), which would be better known as Sekolah Tan Malaka ("Tan Malaka's School"). The schools spread to Bandung and Ternate, with enrollment beginning on 21 June 1921. The schools were the main reason for Tan Malaka's growing prestige and rapid rise within the PKI. As a guidebook for the schools, Tan Malaka wrote the SI Semarang dan Onderwijs, a guide to managing the schools.

In June 1921, Tan Malaka became the chairman of the Serikat Pegawai Pertjitakan ("Printing Workers Association"), and served as the vice chairman and treasurer of the Serikat Pegawai Pelikan Hindia (SPPH; "Indies Oils Workers Association"). Between May and August his first book, Sovjet atau Parlemen? ("Soviet or Parliament?"), which was serialized in the PKI's journal, the Soeara Ra'jat ("People's Voice"); his other works, including articles, were published in another journal and PKI newspaper, the Sinar Hindia ("The Hindia Star"). In June, he was one of the leaders of the Revolutionaire Vakcentrale ("Revolutionary Trade Union Federation"), and in August he was elected to the editorial board of SPPH's journal, the Soeara Tambang ("Miner's Voice"). Tan Malaka then replaced Semaun, who left the Dutch East Indies in October, as the chairman of PKI after a congress on 24 – 25 December 1921 in Semarang. Differences can be seen from their leadership styles, as Semaun was more cautious, whilst Tan Malaka was more radical. Under his leadership, the PKI maintained a good relationship with Sarekat Islam.

=== Exile in Europe ===
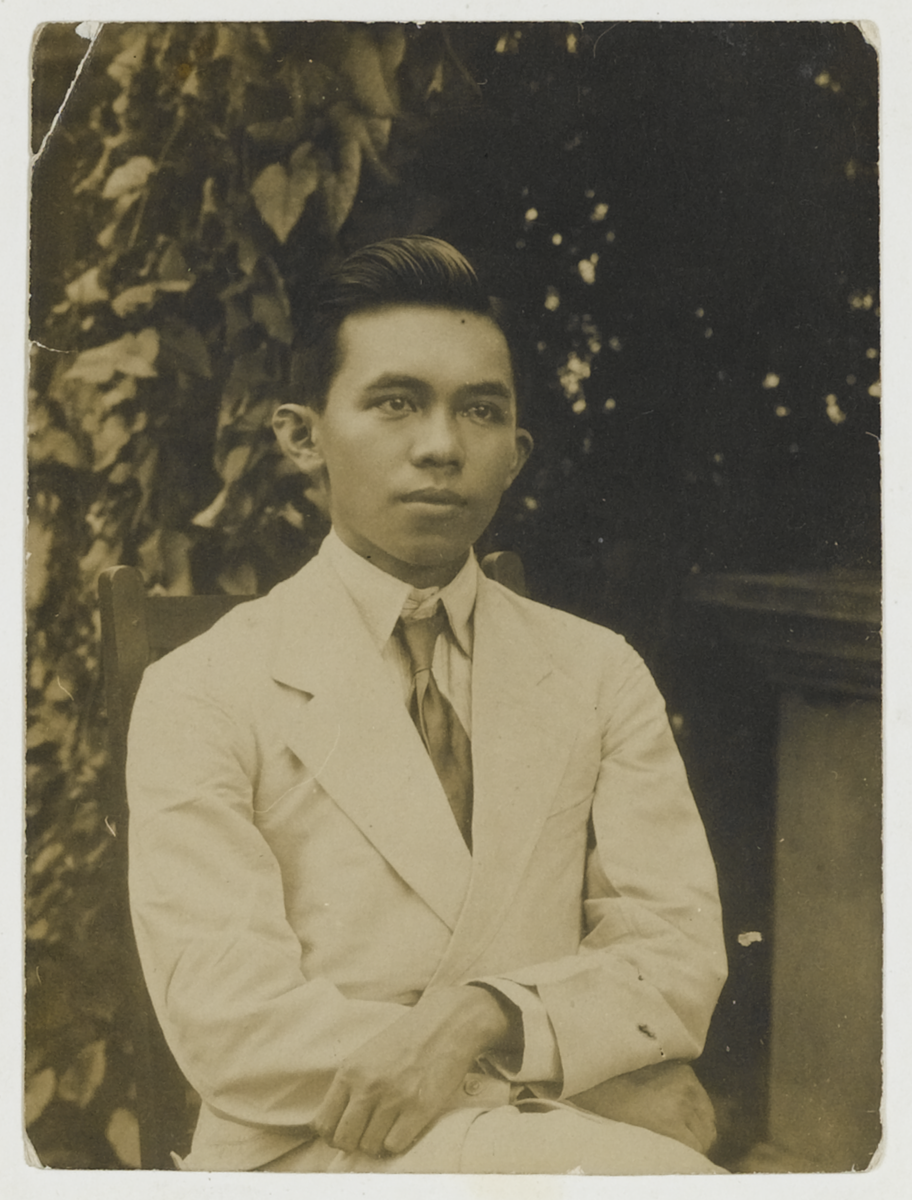
Portrait of Tan Malaka, c. 1922

On 13 February 1922, while he visited a school in Bandung, he was arrested by Dutch authorities, who felt threatened by the existence of the Communist Party. He was first exiled to Kupang; however, he wanted to be exiled to the Netherlands, and was sent there by the Dutch authorities. However, the date of his arrival in the Netherlands is disputed. (Note: Syaifudin states that he arrived in the Netherlands on 10 March, while Helen Jarvis states that he arrived on 24 March.) In the Netherlands, he joined the Communist Party of the Netherlands (CPN) and was appointed as the third candidate of the party for the House of Representatives, at the 1922 elections. He was the first Dutch colonial subject (since he was from the Dutch East Indies) to ever to run for office in the Netherlands. He didn't expect to be elected because, under the system of proportional representation in use, his third position on the ticket made his election highly unlikely. His stated goal in running was instead to gain a platform to speak about Dutch actions in Indonesia, and to work to persuade the CPN to support Indonesian independence. Although he did not win a seat, he received unexpectedly strong support. Before the counting of votes was finished, he left the Netherlands and went to Germany.

In Berlin, he met with Darsono, an Indonesian communist who was related to the West European Bureau of the Comintern, and possibly met M.N. Roy. Tan Malaka then continued to Moscow, and arrived in October 1922 to participate in the Executive Committee of the Comintern. At the Fourth World Congress of the Comintern in Moscow, Tan Malka proposed that communism and Pan-Islamism could collaborate; however, his proposal was rejected by many. In January 1923, he and Semaun were appointed correspondents of Die Rote Gewerkschafts-Internationale ("The Red Union International"). During the first half 1923, he also wrote for the journals of the Indonesian and Dutch labor movements.

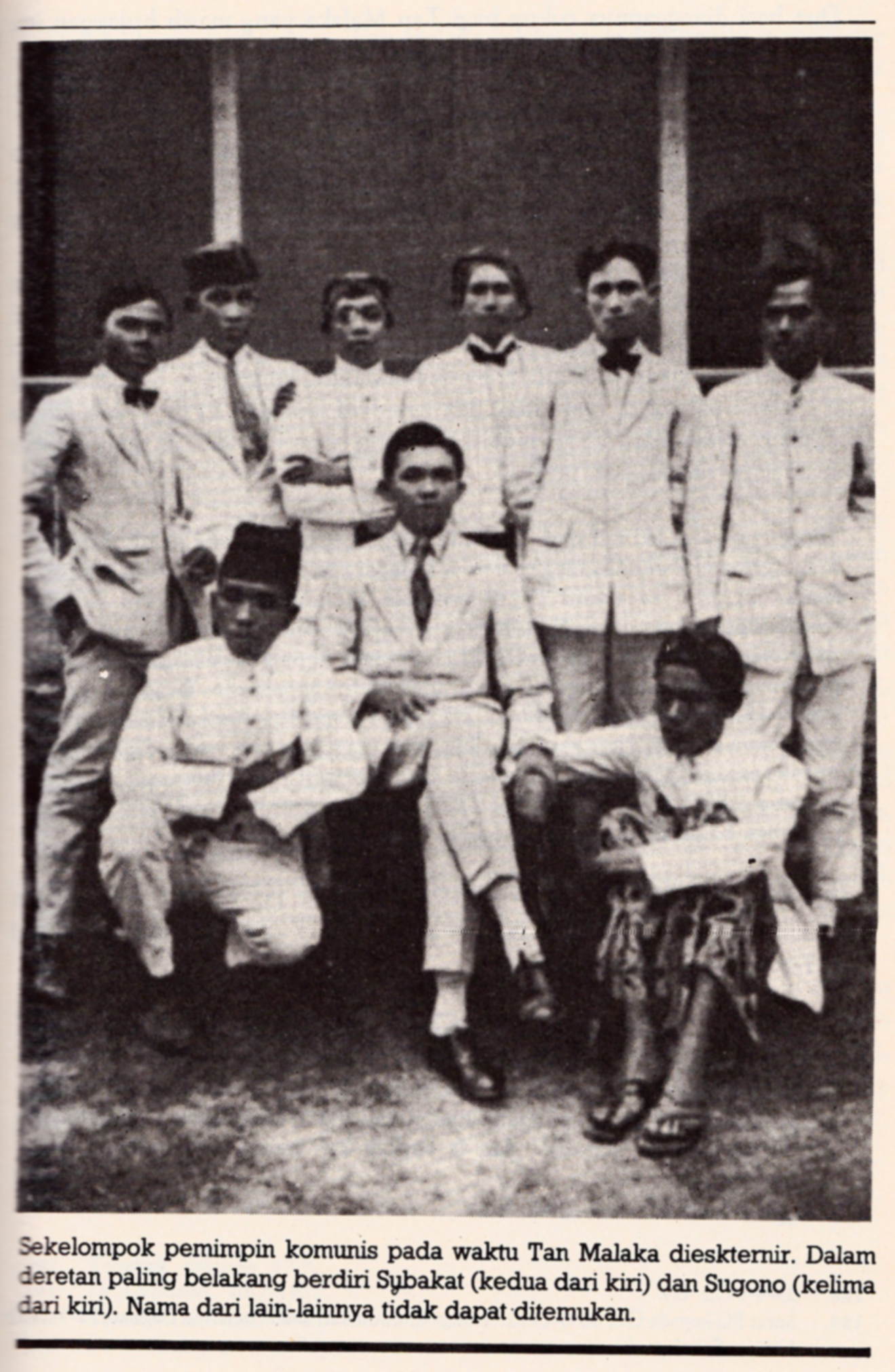
Picture of Tan Malaka and his followers. Backrow from left; Subakat (Second from left); Sugono (Fifth from left)

He also became an agent of the Eastern Bureau of the Comintern as he reported on the ECCI plenum in June 1923. Tan Malaka then went to Canton (now Guangzhou), arriving in December 1923, and edited the English journal, The Dawn, for an organization of transport workers of the Pacific. In August 1924 Malaka requested the government of the Dutch East Indies to allow him to return home because of illness. The government accepted this, but with burdensome terms to be imposed; he did not return home. In December 1924, the PKI began to collapse, as it was suppressed by the Dutch government. As a response, Tan Malaka wrote the Naar de Republiek Indonesia (Towards the Republic of Indonesia), which was published in Canton in April 1925. It explained the situation in the world, from the Netherlands which suffered an economic crisis, the Dutch East Indies which had opportunities to carry out a revolution by nationalist movements and PKI, to his prediction that the United States and Japan would "settle with the sword which of them is the more powerful in the Pacific."

=== Exile in Asia ===
In July 1925, Tan Malaka moved to Manila, Philippines, because the environment was more similar to Indonesia. Malaka arrived in Manila on 20 July. There, he became a correspondent of the nationalist newspaper El Debate ("The Debate"), which was edited by Francisco Varona. Publication of his works, such as a second edition of Naar de Republiek Indonesia (December 1925) and Semangat Moeda (Young Spirit; 1926) might have been supported by Varona. There, Malaka also met with Filipino figures Mariano de los Santos, José Abad Santos, and Crisanto Evangelista. In Indonesia, PKI decided to revolt within six months of its meeting, which was held around December 1925. The government was aware of this and exiled several party leaders. In February 1926, Alimin went to Manila to request approval from Tan Malaka. Tan Malaka eventually rejected this strategy, and stated that the condition of the party was still too weak, and it had no power to carry out yet another revolution. The failure of the 1926 communist uprising in Java shows that he was likely correct.

He described in his autobiography his frustration with his inability to secure information about events in Indonesia from his place in the Philippines, and his lack of influence with the PKI's leadership. As Comintern representative for Southeast Asia, Tan Malaka argued that he had authority to reject the PKI's plan, an assertion which was, in retrospect, denied by certain former PKI members. Tan Malaka sent Alimin to Singapore to convey his views, and ordered him to organize an impromptu meeting between the leaders. Seeing no progress, he went to Singapore himself to meet Alimin and learned that Alimin and Musso had traveled to Moscow to seek help to carry out a revolt. In Singapore, Tan Malaka met Subakat, another PKI leader, who shared his views. They decided to thwart Musso and Alimin's plan. During this period he wrote the Massa Actie (Mass Action), which contained his view on Indonesian revolution and nationalist movements. In this book, he proposes Aslia, a social federation between Southeast Asia countries and Northern Australia. The book was intended to support his effort to reverse the direction of PKI and gain support of the cadres on his side.

== Later life and death ==
=== Attempts at arrest ===
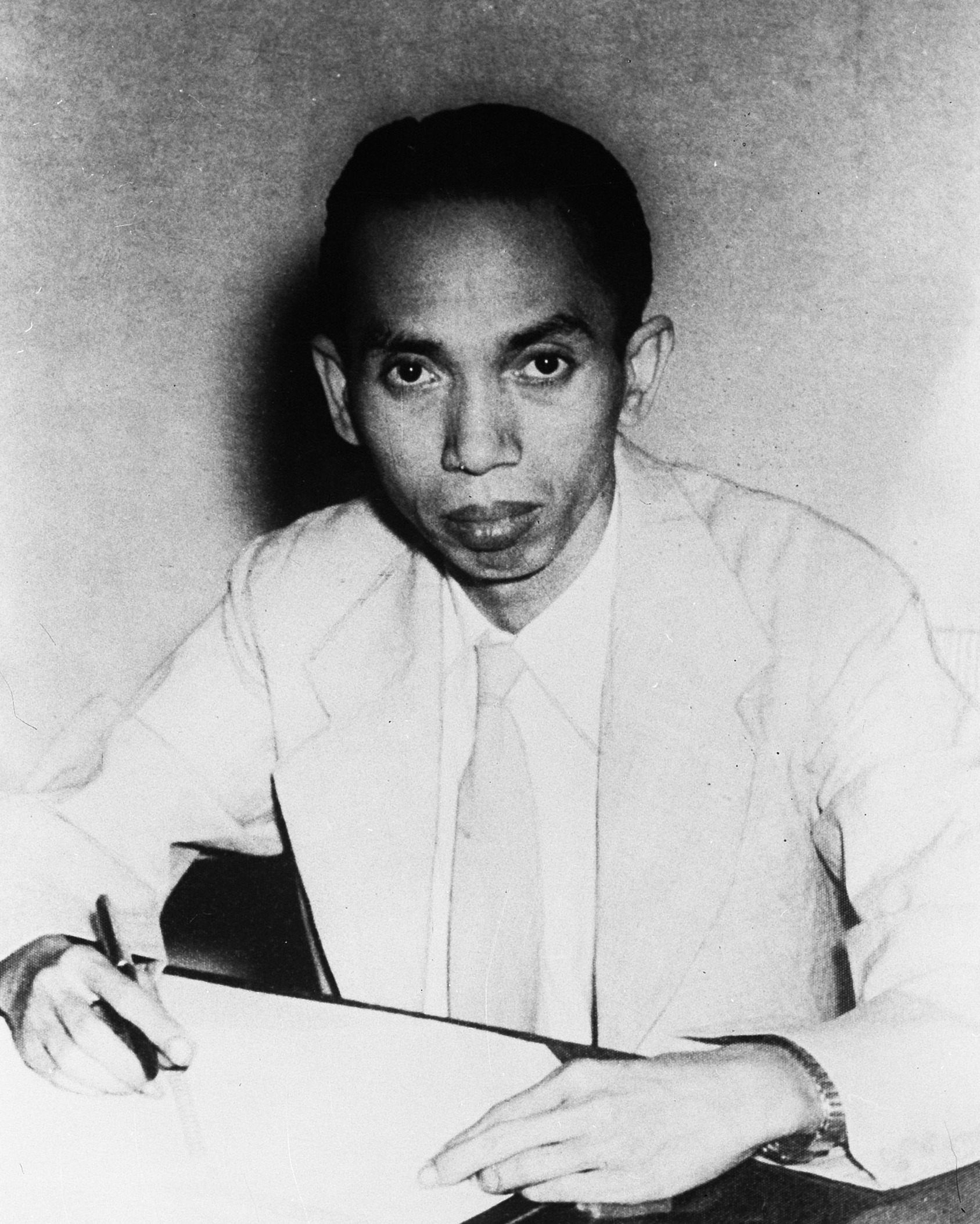
Adam Malik

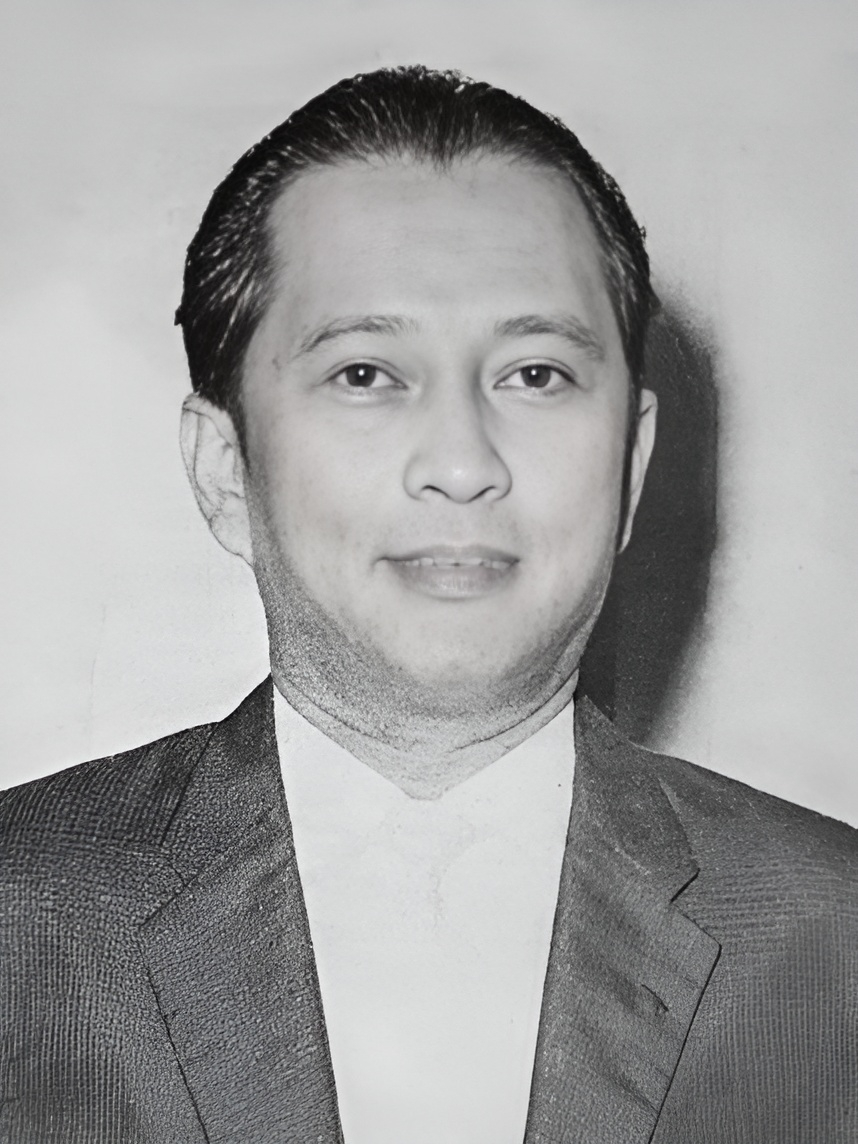
Chaerul Saleh

In December 1926, Tan Malaka went to Bangkok, where he studied the defeat of PKI. He, along with Djamaludin Tamin and Subakat, established the Partai Republik Indonesia ("Republic of Indonesia Party") in early June 1927, distancing himself from the Comintern as well as, in the new party's manifesto, criticizing the PKI. While the party did have a small membership inside the country, it never grew to be a large organization; however, with the PKI gone underground, it was the only organization in the late 1920s which was publicly calling for immediate independence for Indonesia. Some party cadres included future-Vice President Adam Malik, future People's Consultative Assembly Speaker Chaerul Saleh, and poet and politician Mohammad Yamin. He then went back to the Philippines in August 1927. He was arrested on 12 August 1927 for illegal entry into the Philippines. He was defended by Jose Abad Santos in court. However, he accepted the verdict that he would be deported to Amoy (Xiamen), China, to protect the people who helped him procure false papers.

The police of the Kulangsu (Gulangyu) International Settlement, notified of Tan Malaka's passage to Amoy, waited for him in the harbor with the intention of arresting him for extradition to the Dutch East Indies, as the Dutch wanted to apprehend him and send him to the Boven-Digoel concentration camp. But he managed to escape as the sympathetic captain and crew protected him, entrusting his safety to a ship inspector. The ship inspector took Tan Malaka to a guest house from where he made his way to Sionching village with newly made acquaintances. Tan Malaka then traveled to Shanghai in the end of 1929. Poeze wrote that Malaka may have met Alimin there in August 1931, and made an agreement with him that Malaka would work again for the Comintern. Malaka moved to Shanghai in September 1932 after the attack made by the Japanese forces, and decided to go to India, disguised as a Chinese-Filipino and using an alias. When he was in Hong Kong in early October 1932, he was arrested by British officials from Singapore and was detained for several months.

He hoped to have a chance to argue his case under British law and possibly seek asylum in the United Kingdom, but after several months of interrogation and being moved between the "European" and the "Chinese" sections of the jail, it was decided that he would simply be exiled from Hong Kong without charges. He was then deported again to Amoy. Tan Malaka then escaped once again, and traveled to Iwe village in the south of China. There, he was treated with traditional Chinese medicine for his illness. After his health improved in the beginning of 1936, he traveled back to Amoy and formed a Foreign Language School. Abidin Kusno argues that this stay in Shanghai was an important period in shaping Tan Malaka's later actions during the Indonesian revolution of the late 1940s; the port city was nominally under Chinese sovereignty but was dominated first by European nations with trading concessions in the city, and then by Japan after its September 1932 invasion.

The oppression of the Chinese he saw under both of these powers, Kusno argues, contributed to his uncompromising position against collaboration with the Japanese or negotiation with the Dutch in the 1940s, when many prominent Indonesian nationalists were adopting a more conciliatory stance. In August 1937, he went to Singapore under a fake Chinese identity and became a teacher. After the Dutch surrendered to Japan, he returned to Indonesia via Penang. He then sailed to Sumatra arriving in Jakarta in mid-1942, where he wrote Madilog. After he felt he had to have a job, he applied to Social Welfare Agency and was soon sent to a coal mine in Bayah, on southern coast of West Java. During his time there, he disguised himself as a romusha clerk where he thus witness forced laborers toiling for the Japanese war effort in building the Saketi–Bayah railway. He had also met Sukarno during his visit to Bayah, which led to him ending up on a heated debate with sukarno on the nature of Indonesian independence.

=== National revolution ===
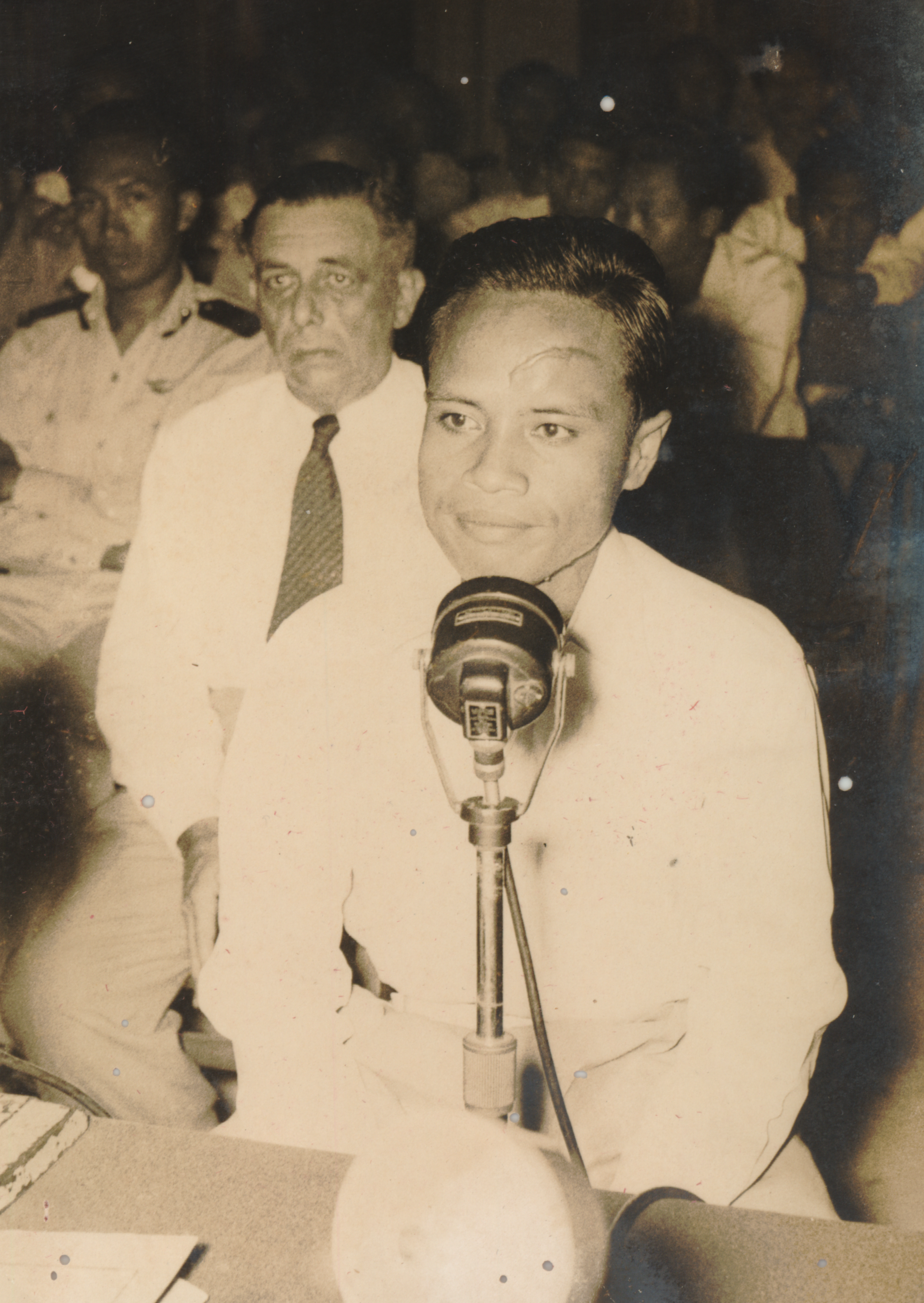
Tan Malaka, c. 1945

After the proclamation of the independence of Indonesia, he began to meet his own people and the younger generation. He also started using his real name again after 20 years using aliases. He then traveled to Java and saw the people of the city of Surabaya, fighting against the British Indian Army in November. He realized the differences of struggling between the people in some places and the leaders in Jakarta. He thought the leaders were too weak in negotiation with the Dutch. His solution to this perceived disconnect was to found the Persatuan Perjuangan ("Struggle Front, or United Action"), a coalition of about 140 smaller groups, notably not including the PKI. After a few months of discussion, the coalition was formally founded at a congress in Surakarta in mid-January 1946.

The coalition adopted a "Minimum Program", which declared that only complete independence was acceptable, that government must obey the wishes of the people, and that foreign-owned plantations and industry should be nationalized. The Persatuan Perjuangan had widespread popular support, as well as support in the republican army, especially Major General Sudirman. In February 1946, the organization forced the temporary resignation of Prime Minister Sutan Sjahrir, a proponent of negotiation with the Dutch, and Sukarno consulted with Tan Malaka to seek his support. However, Tan Malaka was apparently unable to bridge political divisions within his coalition to transform it into actual political control, and he was arrested shortly thereafter, with Sjahrir returning to lead Sukarno's cabinet.

=== Guerrilla and death ===
Upon his release, he spent the following months in Yogyakarta, and attempted to form a new political party called the Partai Murba (Proletarian Party), but was unable to repeat his previous success at attracting a following. When the Dutch captured the national government in December 1948, he fled from Yogyakarta to rural East Java, where he hoped he would be protected by anti-republican guerrilla forces. He established his headquarters in Blimbing, a village surrounded by rice fields, and connected himself to Major Sabarudin, leader of the 38th Battalion. In his opinion, Major Sabarudin's was the only armed group that was actually fighting the Dutch.

Sabarudin, however, was in conflict with all other armed groups. On 17 February, the TNI leaders in East Java decided that Sabarudin and his companions were to be captured and convicted following military law. On 19 February, they captured Tan Malaka in Blimbing. On 20 February, the Dutch Korps Speciale Troepen (KST) happened to start an offensive named "Operation Tiger" from the East Javanese town of Nganjuk. They advanced quickly and brutally. Poeze describes in detail how the TNI soldiers fled into the mountains and how Tan Malaka, already injured, walked into a TNI post and was promptly executed on 21 February 1949. Malaka was fatally shot at the foothills of Mount Wilis, Selopanggung, Kediri Regency after an arrest and detention in Patje village. According to Poeze, the shot was ordered by Second Lieutenant Sukotjo of Sikatan battalion, Brawijaya division. No report was made and Malaka was buried in the woods.

== Thought ==
=== Marxism and religion ===
Tan Malaka argued strongly that Marxism and Islam were compatible, and that in Indonesia revolution should be built upon both. Thus, he was a strong supporter of the PKI's continued alliance with Sarekat Islam (SI), and was troubled when, while he was in exile, the PKI broke away from SI. On an international scale, Tan Malaka also saw Islam as holding the potential for unifying the working classes in vast parts of North Africa, the Middle East, and South Asia against imperialism and capitalism. This position put him in opposition to many European Communists and the leadership of Comintern, who saw religious belief as a hindrance to a proletarian revolution and a tool of the ruling class. He became a trotskyist later during National Revolution and founded Murba party to strongly oppose PKI influence.

=== Politics ===
Malaka described Nietzsche's, Rousseau's, and Marx-Engels' thoughts as thesis, antithesis, and synthesis respectively while he described Hegel–Hindenburg–Stinnes', Danton–Robespierre–Marat's, and the Bolsheviks' thoughts as genesis, negation, and the negation of negation respectively.

=== Education ===
According to Harry A. Poeze, Malaka assumed that the colonial government used the educational system to produce educated indigenous people who would repress their own people. Malaka founded Sekolah Sarekat Islam to rival the government schools. Syaifudin writes that Malaka had four different methods of teaching: dialog, jembatan keledai (mnemonics), critical discussion, and sociodrama. In the dialog method, Malaka used two-way communication while teaching. During his time teaching in Deli, he encouraged students to criticize their teacher, or the Dutchman, who was often wrong. In the SI school, he entrusted students who received higher grades to teach students with lower grades. Jembatan keledai was inspired by al-Ghazali; in addition to memorizing knowledge, the students were instructed to understand and apply it to their daily lives. Syaifudin writes that it is the opposite of the bank style concept, and that it is similar to contextual teaching and learning. In critical discussions, Malaka not only verbally gave a problem to the students, but attempted to expose the problem directly, a method similar to the problem-posing method of Paulo Freire. With his fourth method, sociodrama, Malaka aimed to make the students understand social problems and resolve them through role playing, and to provide entertainment to amuse the students after studying.

== Legacy ==
Indonesian historians describe Malaka as a "communist, nationalist, national communist, Trotskyist, idealist, and Muslim leader", although Malaka himself denies being a Trotskyist, stating that articles 6 and 7 of the Minimum Program go against Trotskyism. Much of western historians consider Tan Malaka's ideological leanings to be less or incompatible from Trotskyist, rejecting the Trotskyist label and preferring 'national-Communist' for Tan Malaka. (Note: Tan Malaka has been characterized as a national communist or as representing a distinct national-communist current by several scholars. Ruth McVey wrote that although Tan Malaka had been labelled a "Trotskyite", his position was difficult to classify precisely and "might perhaps be described as 'national-Communist'". Oliver Crawford, while not employing the term national communism in this context, characterizes Tan Malaka's adaptation of Marxism to Indonesian conditions as using "Marxist analysis to elaborate an essentially nationalist narrative". M. C. Ricklefs refers to him as "the influential 'national Communist' (i.e., non-PKI) Tan Malaka". B. J. Boland also describes him as "the 'national communist' Tan Malaka". Chiara Formichi writes that, following the Madiun Affair, "Tan Malaka's 'national communism' became the only politically viable form of communism in Indonesia" for a period. Peter Zwick argues that Tan Malaka's insistence that Indonesian communism be based upon Indonesian conditions "established a national communist tradition in the PKI". John R. W. Smail describes the Jakarta API as being dominated by "followers of the national Communist Tan Malaka".) Academian Helen Jarvis argues that the connotation that Tan Malaka was a Trotskyist stemmed from a misconception attributing to Nikolai Bukharin’s denunciation of another Indonesian delegate, Alphonso, who critiques the 6th World Congress of the Comintern in 1928. Such became the basis of the labeling of Tan Malaka of being a 'trotskyist' by his opponents; mainly by the PKI as a derogatory term for his followers.

Tan Malaka's best-known written work is his autobiography, Dari Pendjara ke Pendjara. He wrote the three-volume work by hand while imprisoned by the republican Sukarno government in 1947 and 1948. The work alternates between theoretical chapters describing Tan Malaka's political beliefs and philosophy and more conventional autobiographical chapters that discuss various phases of his life. Volume three has an especially loose narrative structure, containing commentary on Marxist historiography, his positions on the ongoing fight with the Netherlands over Indonesia's independence, and reprints of sections of key documents related to the struggle. Dari Pendjara ke Pendjara is one of a very small number of autobiographies set in colonial Indonesia. The translated book, From Jail to Jail (1991), attracted the English speaking labor movement's attention.

== Bibliography ==
- Parlemen atau Soviet - Parliamentary or Soviet (1920)
- SI Semarang dan Onderwijs - SI Semarang and Education (1921)
- Dasar Pendidikan - Basic of Education (1921)
- Tunduk Pada Kekuasaan Tapi Tidak Tunduk Pada Kebenaran - To Abide by Power, But Not by Truth (1922)
- Naar de Republiek Indonesia (Menuju Republik Indonesia) - Towards of the Republic of Indonesia (1924)
- Semangat Muda - Spirit of Youth (1926)
- Massa Actie - Mass Action (1926)
- Local Actie dan National Actie (1926)
- Pari en Nasionalisten - Pari and Nationalism (1927)
- Pari dan PKI - Pari and PKI (1927)
- Pari International (1927)
- Manifesto Bangkok (1927)
- Aslia Bergabung - Aslia Merge (1943)
- Madilog (Materialisme, Dialektika, Logika) - Materialism, Dialectics, and Logic (1943)
- Muslihat - Deception (1945)
- Rencana Ekonomi Berjuang - Struggling Economic Plans (1945)
- Politik - Politics (1945)
- Manifesto Jakarta (1945)
- Thesis (1946)
- Pidato Purwokerto - Purwokerto Speech (1946)
- Pidato Solo - Solo Speech (1946)
- Islam dalam Tinjauan Madilog - Islam in Madilog Views (1948)
- Gerpolek (Gerilya, Politik, Ekonomi) - Guerilla, Politics, Economy (1948)
- Pidato Kediri - Kediri Speech (1948)
- Pandangan Hidup - Views of Life (1948)
- Kuhandel di Kaliurang - I'm Holding in Kaliurang (1948)
- Proklamasi 17-8-45, Isi dan Pelaksanaanya - 17-8-45 Proclamation, Contents and Implementation (1948)
- Dari Pendjara ke Pendjara - From Jail To Jail (1970)
