= Gerpolek =

Book by Tan Malaka

Tan Malaka's Gerpolek, a re-published edition of the original by Djambatan.

Gerpolek, an abbreviation of Gerilya, Politik, Ekonomi (Guerrilla Warfare, Politics, and Economics), is a book written by Tan Malaka while he was imprisoned in Madiun. The work responded to his dissatisfaction with Indonesia’s political and military situation at the time, including the shrinking of Republican-controlled territory following the establishment of Dutch-backed federal states. The entire book is a reflection of Tan Malaka’s ideas, knowledge, and spirit of leadership in defending Indonesia against all forms of colonialism and imperialism. The book proposes the establishment of an economic system based on production by the people to withstand the Dutch offensive, so that Indonesia could become a self-reliant country. General Sudirman regarded Gerpolek as a book on military strategy.

Tan Malaka wrote that the purpose of Gerpolek was a weapon for defending the Proclamation of 17 August and achieving 100 per cent independence. Tan Malaka’s concept of "100 Per Cent Independence" concerned Indonesia’s ability to determine its own destiny without interference from other countries and without compromise.
