= Mystical logic =

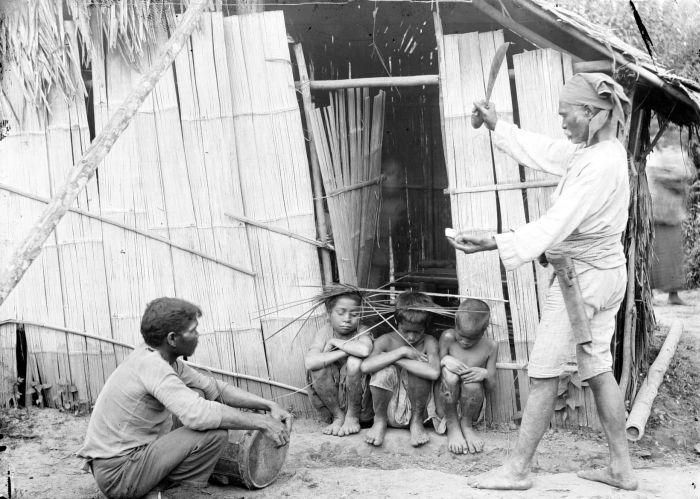
A shaman exorcising evil spirits occupying children, Buru Island (1920).

Mystical logic (Indonesian: Logika mistika) is a political and cultural term by Indonesian Marxist thinker Tan Malaka, principally in his 1943 philosophical work Madilog: Materialisme, Dialektika, Logika. Tan Malaka defined it as "logika yang berdasarkan rohani" ("logic based on the spiritual"), referring to a mode of reasoning in which spiritual, supernatural, or immaterial causes are given explanatory priority over material processes. Tan Malaka argued that the backwardness of Indonesian society was partly caused by continued belief in mystical phenomena whose truth could not be demonstrated empirically.

== Background ==
While in exile in Singapore, Tan Malaka wrote a treatise describing the conditions of Dutch colonialism in Indonesia and advocating efforts toward independence. At the same time, he was troubled by what he regarded as the still-constrained intellectual outlook of Indonesians. He regarded habits of supernatural and non-causal explanation as obstacles to understanding material social conditions and to effective political action; writing Madilog was intended to provide Indonesians with a systematic method of rational/logical analysis, or the dialectic method. The expression itself previously appeared in the East Indies press Sinar Hindia by 1922, when Sarekat Islam activist Soekin contrasted it with rational modes of thought. The term did not appear in Tan Malaka's earliest writings.

== Definition ==
At the beginning of the chapter "Logika Mistika" in Madilog, he introduced the concept through an account of the ancient Egyptian account of the god Ra creating the material world by divine command, which he summarized as a conception of "logic based on the spiritual", in which "rohani" (spiritual) precedes "zat" (matter). Tan Malaka also described Logika Mistika as reasoning founded "purely on trust" ("kepercayaan semata-mata"; lit. blind trust) rather than evidence accessible to the senses or capable of being tested through experience.

Tan Malaka also associates mystical logic with the same breath of philosophical idealism, particularly Hegel's conception of the Absolute Idea. As he would argue that it placed an ideal or spiritual principle prior to material reality. He would instead argue for materialism, seeing the material world as primary and that "all ideas were derived from material causes". According to Academic Oliver Crawford, the division of Tan Malaka's idealism and materialist philosophies was largely influenced by Friedrich Engels's Anti-Dühring. In Madilog, he also cites Ludwig Feuerbach and Lenin’s Materialism and Empirio-criticism concerning such division.

Although for the matters of religion were often connotated, Tan Malaka mentions the questions concerning God, the soul, heaven, and hell outside the empirical jurisdiction of Madilog and described so as "matters of individual belief".

== Academic analysis ==
Academic Oliver Crawford describes the significance of mystical logic in Indonesia as follows:

Indeed, [Malaka] believed that Indonesians were starved of knowledge of logic in general. This was in spite of the fact that scientific reasoning and dialectical materialism had, in his view, entirely transformed the world. Science had made extraordinary new discoveries possible, while dialectics had provided analytical tools which enabled unparalleled political transformations, [...] These ideas, however, had passed Indonesia by. The Indonesian mind remained trapped in ‘mystical’ patterns of thought. This is what made Madilog necessary, as a textbook to provide the Indonesian people with a training in formal logic and dialectics, giving them reason and so allowing them to overcome their superstitions. Philosophy and science were not esoteric subjects, but the necessary prerequisites of effective political action.

== See also ==
- Magical thinking
- Mythopoeic thought
- Dialectical materialism
