= Rangkasbitung-Labuan railway =

Railway line in Indonesia

Rangkasbitung–Labuan railway
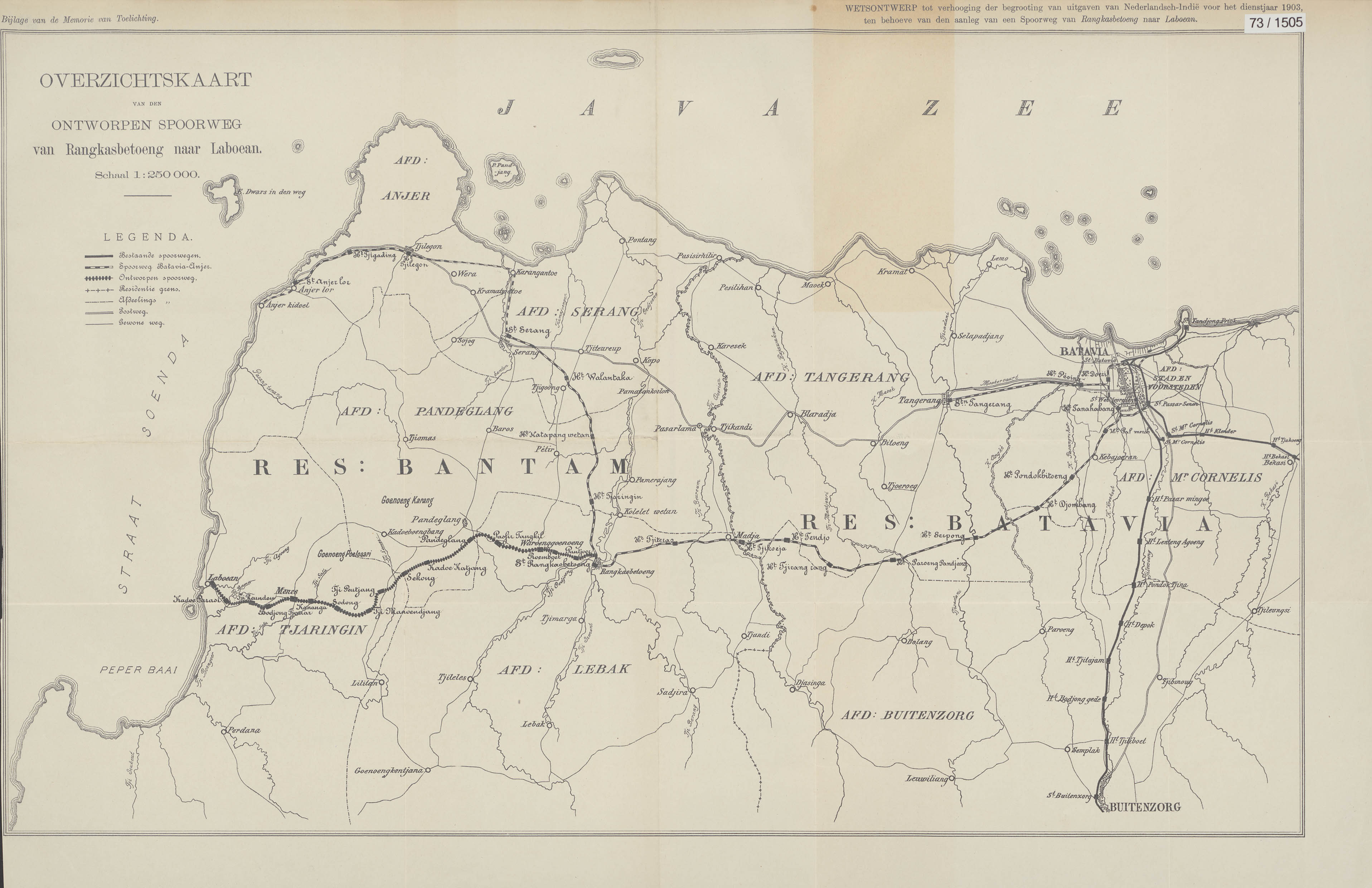
- Railway plan map (1903)

Overview
- Status: Ceased operation
- Locale: Banten
- Termini: Rangkasbitung; Labuan

Service
- Type: Heavy rail

History
- Opened: 1906
- Closed: 1982

Technical
- Line length: 55.8 km
- Num of tracks: 1
- Track gauge: 1,067 mm (3 ft 6 in)

The Rangkasbitung–Labuan railway was a single-track and 1,067 mm (3 ft 6 in) gauge railway, branching off the Jakarta Kota–Anyer Kidul railway at Rangkasbitung. The public railway company statsspoorwegen built the line as part of the Western railways (Dutch: Westerlijnen) in order to improve connectivity with the western regions on Java.

The 55.8 km long line was in use between 18 June 1906 and 1982. Parts of the infrastructure are still present.

Between 1944 and 1951, a branch line went from Saketi to the south coast near Bayah, Lebak.

== Stations ==
The following is a list of stations in order of position on this railway:

- Rangkasbitung
- Warunggunung
- Cibuah
- Pasirtangkil
- Pandeglang
- Cibiuk
- Cimenyan
- Kadukacang
- Sekong
- Cipeucang
- Cikadueun
- Saketi, with a branch line to Bayah
- Sodong
- Kenanga
- Menes
- Babakanlor
- Kalumpang
- Labuan
