= 3 July Affair =

1946 political upheaval in the Republic of Indonesia

- Part of the Indonesian National Revolution
- Date: 3 July 1946
- Location: Surakarta
- Participants: Sutan Sjahrir; Sukarno; Tan Malaka; Muhammad Yamin; Sudarsono; Sudirman
- Outcome: Sutan Sjahrir was released; Reform of the Indonesian Army

The 3 July Affair in 1946 was a political upheaval in the then newly formed Republic of Indonesia. Prime Minister Sutan Sjahrir was kidnapped by factions within the military opposing the Republic's negotiations with the Dutch during the Indonesian National Revolution. It ended with the release of Sjahrir and a re-structure of both the Republican government and the army.

== Events ==
Following the Allied occupation of Jakarta, Indonesian Republicans moved their capital to the city of Yogyakarta exposing armed units in the city to civilian political intrigue. President Sukarno's decision to commence negotiations with the Dutch was opposed by various Indonesian factions, which formed into the "Persatoean Perdjoangan" ("Union of Struggle"), a group led by communist Tan Malaka. Persatoean Perdjoangan's opposition to negotiation with the Dutch received sympathy from many sections of the armed forces, including its commander Sudirman and Major-General Sudarsono.

On 27 June, Indonesian Army units under Sudarsono released Malaka and followers from prison in Surakarta. Prime Minister Sutan Sjahrir, who was leading the negotiations with the Dutch, was arrested the same night in Surakarta and taken to the Sultan's Palace with other figures. Meanwhile, Sudarsono's troops occupied the city of Yogyakarta. Indonesian president Sukarno declared martial law and demanded Sjahrir's release. Troops loyal to Sukarno advanced on Surakarta from Surabaya and the loyal Siliwangi division sent troops to Yogyakarta. Adam Malik and other young radicals were arrested.

On 2 July, Sudarsono and Muhammad Yamin visited Sukarno and demanded that Sjahrir be replaced by communist leader Malaka. Sjahrir, supposedly still a captive, surprised everyone by walking into the room, and Sukarno ordered the arrest of Sudarsono and Yamin. On 3 July, army units released Malik from jail and demanded that Sudirman be put in charge of security. The government was re-organised by Sjahrir to include Muhammad Natsir, Amir Sjarifuddin, the Sultan of Yogya, Agus Salim, and Djuanda, and the army's Division III was restructured.
