= Massa Actie =

Mass Action
- Cover of the book Massa Actie
- Author: Tan Malaka
- Original title: Massa Actie
- Language: Dutch
- Subject: Tatwa
- Published: 1926^{a}
- Pages: 164 (first Indonesian-language edition using the Enhanced Spelling System)
- ^{a} The first edition (1926) was self-published by the author in Dutch; an Indonesian-language edition was not published until 1947 by Poestaka Moerba.

Massa Actie, or Mass Action, is a book by Tan Malaka written in Singapore in 1926. The book discusses the power of mass action and how it can be carried out effectively. Tan Malaka, an Indonesian independence activist, wrote the book based on his experiences while living abroad and drew inspiration from contemporary social and political movements. ''Aksi Massa'' has been published in several editions, including editions by Teplok Press in 2000 and Narasi in 2013.
