= Madilog =

Nonfiction book by Tan Malaka

- Title page of the 2014 edition.^{a}
- Author: Tan Malaka^{b}
- Original title: Madilog
- Translator: Ted Sprague (into Dutch)
- Language: Indonesian
- Subject: Philosophy (synthesis of Dialectical materialism and Logics)
- Published: 1943
- Publication place: Indonesia
- Pages: 568 (first Indonesian edition)
- ^{a} First edition (1943) was the author's own publisher. ^{b} First publication, Malaka used the pen name "Iljas Hussein".

The Madilog by Iljas Hussein (the pen name of Tan Malaka), first published in 1943, official first edition 1951, is the magnum opus of Tan Malaka, the Indonesian national hero and is the most influential work in the history of modern Indonesian philosophy. Madilog is an Indonesian acronym that stands for Materialisme Dialektika Logika (literally, Materialism Dialectics Logics). It is a synthesis of Marxist dialectical materialism and Hegelian logic. Madilog was written in Batavia where Malaka was hiding during the Japanese occupation of the Dutch East Indies, disguised as a tailor.

If Malaka's essay "Naar de Republiek Indonesië" ("Towards a Republic of Indonesia") published in 1928, under the Dutch East Indies government, stands as a formulation of the national identity of Indonesia, then Madilog stands as an anticlimax of his ideas in the sense of building the Indonesian character in modern society. Although Madilog is based on Marxism, it neither implements the Marxist view nor tries to establish a cultural pattern based on Marxism. Madilog is purely Malaka's nationalist perspective by way of being influenced by Hegelian dialectics, Feuerbach's materialism, Marx's views of scientific reason, and logical positivism. The book is to be a new alternative to the usual Indonesian way of thinking and movement, of a people living on thousands of islands, with hundreds languages and cultures, with most believing in mystical logic (Indonesian: logika mistika). In the first three chapters, the book emphasizes that Indonesian social classes differ from those of European society, thus unmodified Marxism cannot be applied due to ontological differences.

== History ==
Madilog was written by Tan Malaka in Rawajati, near a shoe factory in Kalibata, Pantjoran, Batavia. Malaka stayed there between 1942 and 1943 as a tailor, while inspecting the condition of the city and kampungs in Batavia, from where he left over 20 years before. He spent 720 hours writing Madilog, over 8 months from July 1942 to March 1943, spending approximately 3 hours a day on the book and Gabungan Aslia (Aslia Merged), which was written at the same time. Publication had to be postponed due to lack of money and being under strict supervision of the Japanese Keibōdan during World War II, from 1942 to 1945, when Indonesian independence was declared.

While writing Madilog, Malaka served as Chairman of the Agency to Aid Defense (Indonesian old-spelling: Badan Pembantoe Pembelaan, BPP) and as Chairman of the Agency to Help Worker Soldiers (Indonesian old-spelling: Badan Pembantoe Pradjoerit Pekerdja, BP3), to help forced laborers (Romusha). He was eventually elected as representative for Bantam to the Young Generation Congress (Indonesian old-spelling: Congres Angkatan Moeda, Dutch: Congres van de Jonge Generatie), but his swearing-in was cancelled. In Bantam, he met some Indonesian nationalist youth activists such as Sukarni, Chaerul Saleh, and Wikana, who would be known as members of Persatuan Perdjuangan in Surakarta in 1948.

Madilog introduced the Madilog idea. It was first self-published in 1943, using the pen name Iljas Hussein, and 568 pages in length. In the post-independence era, Madilog was published by Widjaya Publisher, in 1951, in Jakarta. Madilog was translated into Dutch by Ted Sprague and was published in 1962 in The Hague.
