= Saketi–Bayah railway =

Railway line in Indonesia

Overview
- Native name: Jalur kereta api Saketi–Bayah
- Status: Ceased operation
- Locale: Banten
- Termini: Saketi; Gunung Mandur
- Stations: 9 large, 5 small

Service
- Type: Heavy rail

History
- Opened: 1 April 1944
- Closed: August 1951

Technical
- Line length: 89.35 km (55.52 mi)
- Number of tracks: 1
- Track gauge: 1,067 mm (3 ft 6 in)
- Highest elevation: 113 m (371 ft)

The Saketi–Bayah railway was a single track and 1,067 mm (3 ft 6 in) gauge railway, located in the west of Java, Indonesia. It branched off the Rangkasbitung-Labuan railway, going from Saketi in central Banten to Bayah on the southern Bantenese coast. The railway was constructed during the Japanese occupation of the Dutch East Indies in World War II, primarily for transporting brown coal from the Bayah mines.

== History ==
When the Japanese occupied the Dutch East Indies (modern-day Indonesia) from 1942 to 1945, they wanted each of their occupied regions to be self-sufficient. Without importing coal, the locomotives on Java had to rely partially on wood as fuel, since the Javanese coal deposits were small and hard to reach. The wood was not enough however, so after finding government reports from c. 1900 about brown coal deposits in the south of Banten, the Japanese began constructing mines near Bayah and Mount Mandur (Indonesian: Gunung Mandur).

=== Railway construction ===
Since transporting brown coal by road would be unreliable in the tropical rain climate and limited due to truck capacity, construction on a railway to Bayah started in July 1942. The line from Saketi to Bayah was divided into about 10 sectors, each with a work force of approximately a thousand rōmusha (local forced labourers), a few engineers and technicians (mainly Dutch), headed by a Japanese supervisor. While the rōmusha working in the mines were imported from Central and East Java, the railway rōmusha were mainly locals from Banten. The construction took a total of 12 million person-days in 14 months.

Working conditions were harsh due to food shortages, lack of medical care, and the tropical climate. Casualties are estimated to range from 20 to 60 thousand victims, not including mine workers. In remembrance of the perished labourers, a monument was built near Bayah's railway station after the war. It is reported to have been 1.5 m (4.9 ft) wide by 3 m (9.8 ft) tall and included a list of victims.

=== Sabotage by resistance ===
An Indo-European and Javanese resistance group, headed by a certain communist called Diponegoro from Purwokerto, sabotaged the railway line several times during its construction, including blowing up a bridge pillar in December 1943. After Diponegoro disappeared, the group was betrayed and in June 1944 the Kempeitai secret police arrested seven members. Six survived due to Japan surrendering earlier than the planned execution date.

=== Exploitation ===
The railway was finally opened on 1 April 1944. The line hauled at most 300 tons of brown coal and about 800 passengers each day. The whole project did little to alleviate the fuel problem in the end, since only 4000 tons of coal were mined per year instead of the targeted 300,000 tons, most likely due to estimation errors.

Exploitation continued after the surrender of Japan in August 1945, although the Indonesian railway companies Angkatan Moeda Kereta Api (AMKA) and Djawatan Kereta Api Repoeblik Indonesia (DKARI) had difficulty maintaining it after the forced labourers left and civil unrest swept across the region. By 1948 a train journey from Rangkasbitung to Bayah was reported to take half a day. The rolling stock consisted primarily of regular SS stock, like the Mallet locomotive SS series 501–516.

=== Final years ===
Railway operations came to a standstill, when the Dutch regained power during Operation Kraai in December 1948. The region was deemed too dangerous to continue exploitation, even after the Netherlands recognised Indonesian independence on 27 December 1949.

After the local Islamist insurgency had finally been put to rest, the Saketi–Bayah railway was used again in January 1951, but only to move out machinery and tools. The railway closed definitively in August. In November 1951, a commission deemed restoring the damaged line to be a waste of resources in the sparsely populated area. Unlike other closed lines on Java, the Saketi–Bayah railway was demolished soon afterwards and its remains were re-used elsewhere. By 1980, all Japanese buildings had gone and bridge foundations, a few railway tracks, and some raised platforms were all that remained.

== Railway description ==
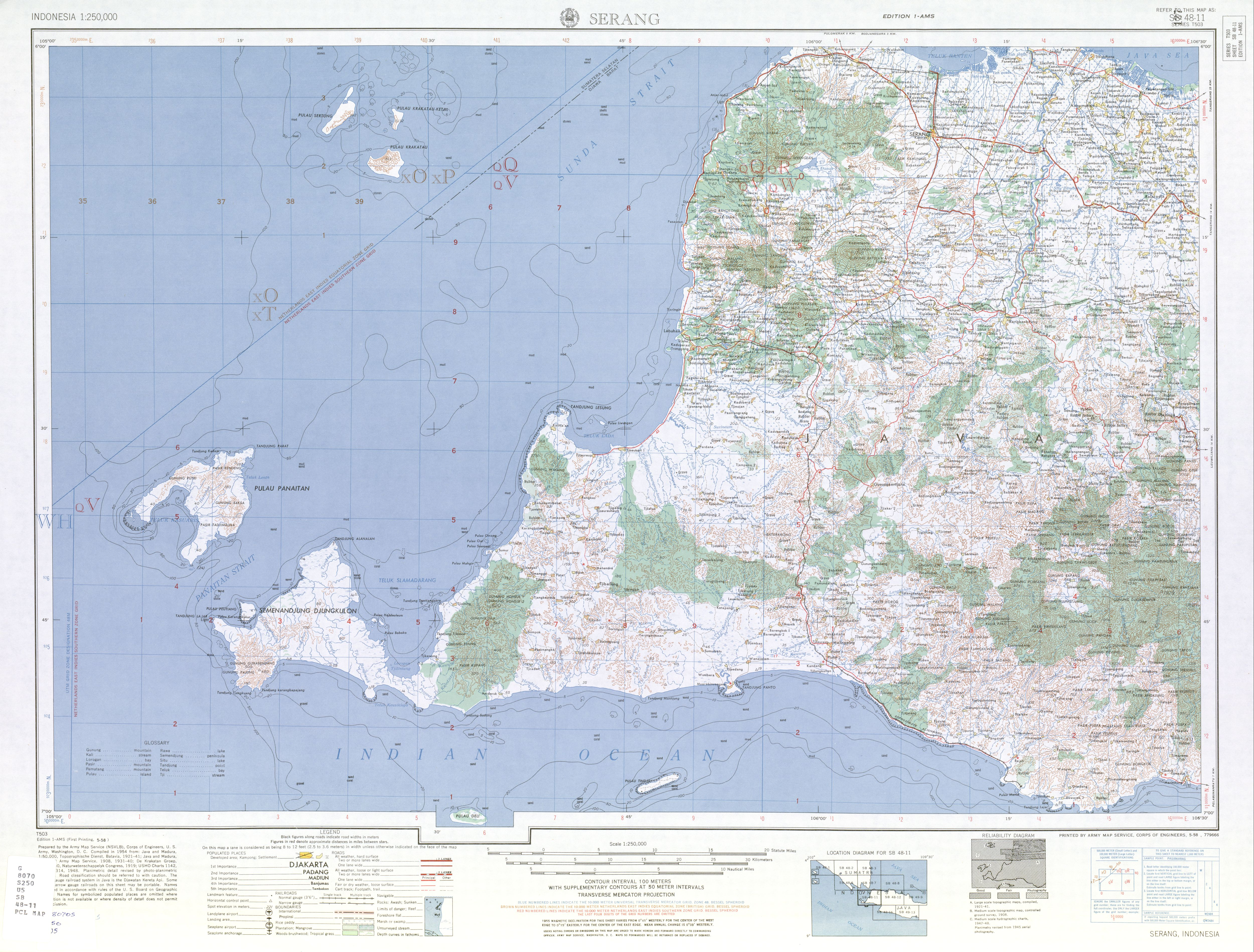
Map of Banten with the Saketi-Bayah railway starting from the map's centre and going south (1954)

The Saketi–Bayah railway covered 89.35 km (55.52 mi) from Saketi to its end terminus near Mount Mandur. Its highest point was at 113 m (371 ft), while its lowest point was a stretch along the coast at 10 m (33 ft). The 1,067 mm (3 ft 6 in) single track passed 29 bridges, 9 railway stations and 5 smaller stops. Narrow gauge lines connected 20 mining shafts at 3 locations with the railway around Bayah and Mount Mandur.

=== Stations ===
Each station had at least two tracks, a small building and wooden lever frames for railway signalling, except Bayah and Gunung Mandur. The following is a list of the 9 stations and 5 smaller stops on this railway in order of position:

- Saketi
- Cimanggu
- Kaduhauk
- Jalupang
- Pasung
- Kerta
- Gintung
- Malingping
- Cilangkahan
- Sukahujan
- Cihara
- Panyawungan
- Bayah: had 5 tracks and an iron lever frame constructed by the Alkmaarsche IJzer- en Metaalgieterij
- Gunung Mandur: had no lever frame, being a railway terminus

== Reopening ==
There are plans to reopen parts of the Saketi-Bayah and Rangkasbitung-Labuan railways for commercial transport, such as cement from the Merah Putih factory in Bayah. The reactivation is part of the Transportation Ministry's 2015–2019 railway strategy, which includes the reopening of 438 km of unused railways.
