= Rōmusha =

Japanese conscripted workers during WWII

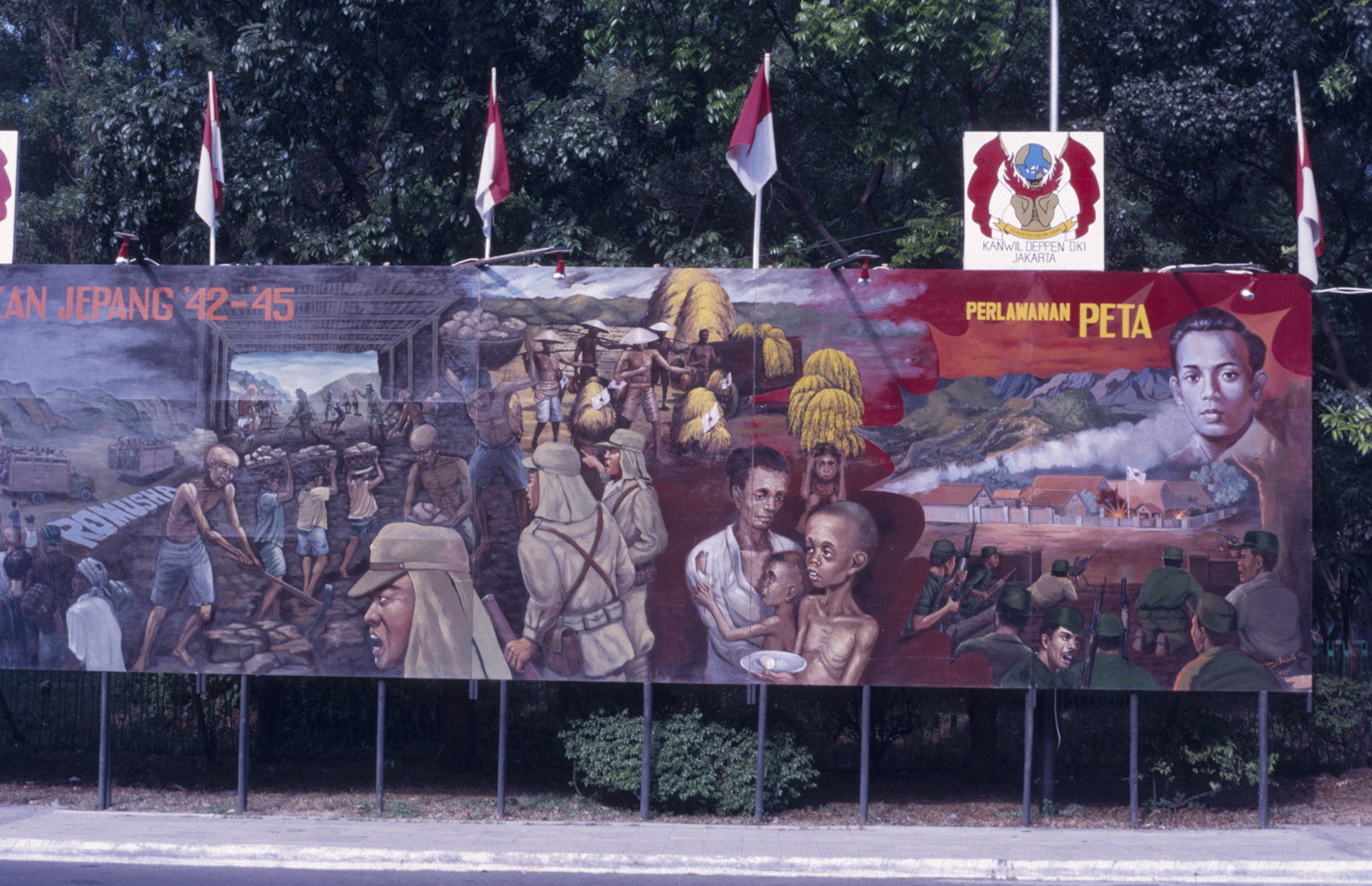
Rōmusha commemorative image on the public board of Indonesian independence in 1985

Rōmusha (労務者) (compare corvée), is a Japanese language word for a "paid conscripted laborer." In English, it usually refers to non-Japanese who were forced to work for the Japanese military during World War II. The U.S. Library of Congress estimates that in Java, between 4 and 10 million rōmushas were forced to work (often at low pay) by the Japanese military during the Japanese occupation of the Dutch East Indies (now Indonesia), many of whom experienced harsh conditions and either died or were stranded far from home. With the term imprecisely defined by both the Japanese and the Allies, estimates of the total number of rōmushas may include the kinrōhōshi (lit. 'unpaid forced laborers'), native auxiliary forces (such as troops of the Japanese-allied Indonesian volunteer army Defenders of the Homeland), and voluntary transmigrants to other islands in Indonesia.

== Overview ==
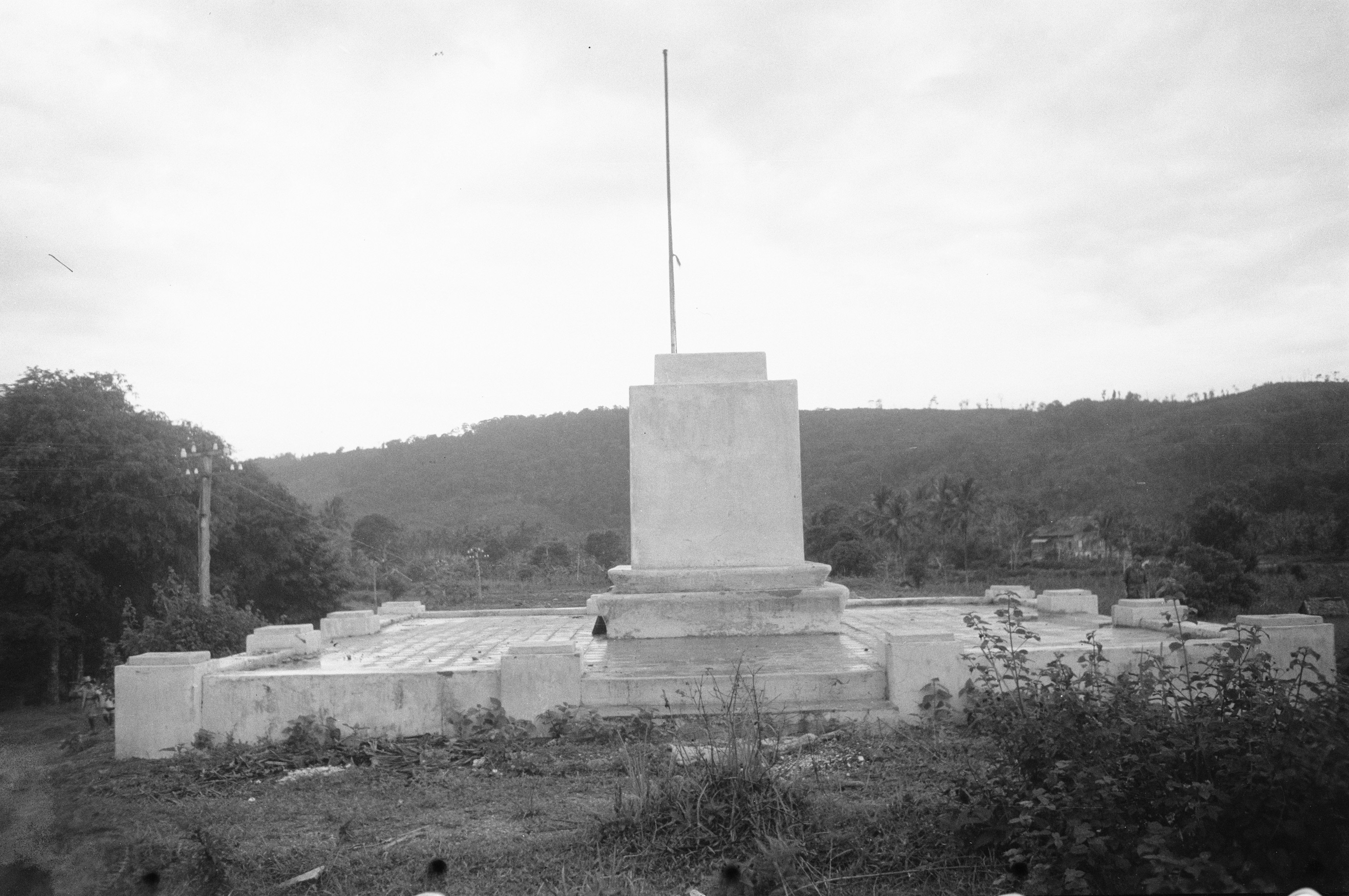
Monument in memory of the Rōmusha who died in Banten

The rōmusha were conscripted laborers, mobilized in Sumatra and eastern Indonesia as well as Java. Some ten percent were women. Their tenures of service ranged from one day to the time required to complete a specific project. The types of work required were very diverse, ranging from light housekeeping work to heavy construction. As a general rule, the rōmusha were mobilized within each regency and were able to walk to work from home. However, for very large construction projects, the rōmusha could be sent to other regencies. When their specified period was finished, they were returned home and replaced with new workers. However, many were sent away from Indonesia to other Japanese-held areas in Southeast Asia.

Although exact figures are unknown, M. C. Ricklefs estimates that between 200,000 and 500,000 Javanese laborers were sent away from Java to the outer islands, and as far as Burma and Thailand. Of those taken off Java, Ricklefs estimates that only 70,000 survived the war. However, Shigeru Satō estimates that about 270,000 Javanese laborers were sent outside of Java, including around 60,000 in Sumatra. Satō estimates that 135,000 were repatriated to Java after the war by the Dutch and the British (not including those found in Sumatra). Apart from those repatriated, there were also those who returned by other means even before the Japanese capitulated. According to Satō, the proportion of rōmusha laborers who died or were stranded overseas amounts to about 15%.

== History ==
The practice of unpaid corvée labor had been common during the colonial period of the Dutch East Indies. Any wages paid to the rōmusha failed to keep pace with inflation, and they were often forced to work while exposed to hazardous conditions with inadequate food, shelter or medical care. The general Japanese treatment of laborers was poor. The rōmusha were supplemented by unpaid laborers, the kinrōhōshi, who performed mostly menial labour. The kinrōhōshi were recruited for a briefer duration than the rōmusha by means of neighborhood associations known as tonarigumi, and were theoretically volunteers, although considerable social coercion was applied to "volunteer" as a show of loyalty to the Japanese cause. During 1944, the number of kinrōhōshi in Java amounted approximately to 200,000 people. The brutality of the rōmusha and other forced labor systems was a major reason for the great death rate among Indonesians during the Japanese occupation. A later UN report stated that four million people died in Indonesia as a result of the Japanese occupation. In addition to this, around 2.4 million people died in Java from famine during 1944–45.

From 1944, the Defenders of the Homeland also utilized thousands of rōmusha for the construction of military facilities, and for economic projects to help make Java more self-sufficient due to Allied blockades.

The Japanese military made extensive use of such forced labor for the construction of the Burma-Thailand Railway during 1942–43, and the Sumatra Railway in 1943–45. The death rate among rōmusha from atrocities, starvation, and disease was much greater than the death rate among Allied prisoners of war.
