= Cabinet of Indonesia =

- Incumbent: Red and White Cabinet
- National emblem of Indonesia

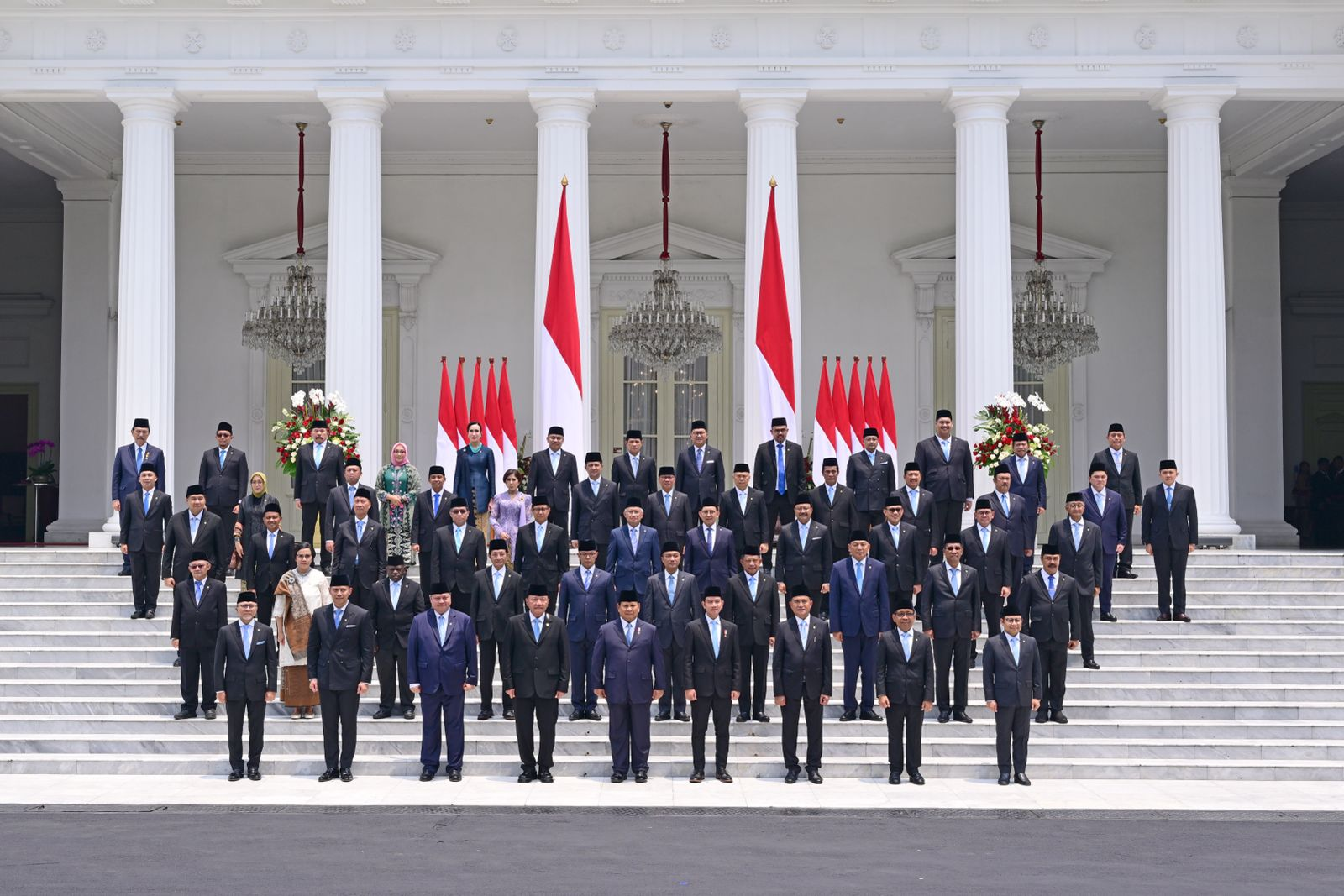
- Red and White Cabinet (2024)

Cabinet overview
- Formed: 2 September 1945 (81 years ago)
- Jurisdiction: Government of Indonesia
- Headquarters: Cabinet Secretariat, Jakarta
- Cabinet executive: Prabowo Subianto, President
- Key document: Chapter 17 of UUD 1945
- Website: setkab.go.id

The Cabinet of the Republic of Indonesia (Indonesian: Kabinet Republik Indonesia) is part of the executive branch of the Indonesian government. It is composed of the most senior appointed officers of the executive branch of the government serving under the president. Members of the Cabinet (except for the vice president) serves at the president's pleasure, who can dismiss them at will for no cause.

Indonesia has seen dozens of cabinets since independence in 1945. Although after the New Order most cabinets remained unchanged for five years at a time. Most cabinets are referred to by the names given them at the time of formation. The current presidential cabinet is the Red and White Cabinet of Prabowo Subianto.

== History ==
The concept of a cabinet is not mentioned explicitly in the 1945 Constitution, so Indonesia's cabinets since 14 November 1945 are the result of administrative convention. There have been two types of cabinet in Indonesian history; presidential and parliamentary. In presidential cabinets, the president is responsible for government policy as head of state and government, while in parliamentary cabinets, the cabinet carries out government policy, and is responsible to the legislature.

During the War of Independence from 1945 to 1949, the cabinet changed from a presidential to a parliamentary system, despite this not being the system intended by those who drew up the Constitution; however, at several critical periods, it reverted to a presidential system. During this period, the cabinet had between 16 and 37 ministers with 12-15 ministries.

On 27 December 1949, the Netherlands recognised the sovereignty of the United States of Indonesia (RIS). Under the Federal Constitution of 1949, the RIS had a parliamentary cabinet as ministers were responsible for government policy. With the return to the unitary state of Indonesia in August 1950, the parliamentary cabinet system remained due to an agreement between the governments of the RIS and the Republic of Indonesia (a constituent of the RIS). Article 83 of the Provisional Constitution of 1950 stated that ministers had full responsibility for government policy. Over the following nine years there were seven cabinets with between 18 and 25 members.

On 5 July 1959, President Sukarno issued a decree abrogating the 1950 Constitution and returning to the 1945 Constitution. The cabinet was also dissolved. A new presidential cabinet was formed shortly after, but this new cabinet did not follow the 1945 Constitution either, as the office of prime minister still existed, along with deputy prime ministers. Moreover, the offices of Chief Justice of the Supreme Court of Indonesia and Speaker of the People's Representative Council which were supposed to be equal to the president, and the office of Chairman of the People's Consultative Assembly, which was supposed to be above all government branches, were included into the Cabinet. During the final years of Sukarno's presidency, cabinets were larger, peaking at 111 ministers.

During the New Order under President Suharto, cabinets were smaller, and from 1968 until 1998 lasted for the five-year presidential term. Offices that were not sanctioned by the 1945 Constitution were abolished. Following the fall of Suharto and the beginning of the Reformasi era, the presidential cabinet system has been retained.

Until 2010, cabinet ministries were dubbed 'departments' (departemen) following the United States model. After 2010, all 'departments' were renamed into 'ministries' (kementerian), thus bringing them in line with the Netherlands model of ministries and a state secretariat.

== List of Indonesian cabinets ==
Parliamentary cabinets were usually known by the name of the prime minister, but after 1959 they were named after their principal tasking. The complete list of cabinets follows:

| Historical era | Name | Leader | Period of office |
|---|---|---|---|
| War of Independence (1945–1949) | Presidential | Sukarno | 2 September 1945 – 14 November 1945 |
| War of Independence (1945–1949) | First Sjahrir | Sutan Sjahrir | 14 November 1945 – 12 March 1946 |
| War of Independence (1945–1949) | Second Sjahrir | Sutan Sjahrir | 12 March 1946 – 2 October 1946 |
| War of Independence (1945–1949) | Third Sjahrir | Sutan Sjahrir | 2 October 1946 – 3 July 1947 |
| War of Independence (1945–1949) | First Amir Sjarifuddin | Amir Sjarifuddin | 3 July 1947 – 11 November 1947 |
| War of Independence (1945–1949) | Second Amir Sjarifuddin | Amir Sjarifuddin | 11 November 1947 – 29 January 1948 |
| War of Independence (1945–1949) | First Hatta | Mohammad Hatta | 29 January 1948 – 19 December 1949 |
| War of Independence (1945–1949) | Emergency | Sjafruddin Prawiranegara | 19 December 1948 – 13 July 1949 |
| War of Independence (1945–1949) | First Hatta | Mohammad Hatta | 13 July 1949 – 4 August 1949 |
| War of Independence (1945–1949) | Second Hatta | Mohammad Hatta | 4 August – 20 December 1949 |
| United States of Indonesia (1949–1950) | RUSI | Mohammad Hatta | 20 December 1949 – 6 September 1950 |
| United States of Indonesia (1949–1950) | Republic of Indonesia (1949–1950) | | |
| United States of Indonesia (1949–1950) | Susanto | Susanto Tirtoprodjo | 20 December 1949 – 21 January 1950 |
| United States of Indonesia (1949–1950) | Halim | Abdul Halim | 21 January 1950 – 6 September 1950 |
| United States of Indonesia (1949–1950) | State of East Indonesia (1947–1950) | | |
| United States of Indonesia (1949–1950) | First Nadjamuddin | Nadjamuddin Daeng Malewa | 13 January 1947 – 2 June 1947 |
| United States of Indonesia (1949–1950) | Second Nadjamuddin | Nadjamuddin Daeng Malewa | 2 June 1947 – 11 October 1947 |
| United States of Indonesia (1949–1950) | Warouw | Semuel Jusof Warouw | 11 October 1947 – 15 December 1947 |
| United States of Indonesia (1949–1950) | First Gde Agung | Ide Anak Agung Gde Agung | 15 December 1947 – 12 January 1949 |
| United States of Indonesia (1949–1950) | Second Gde Agung | Ide Anak Agung Gde Agung | 12 January 1949 – 27 December 1949 |
| United States of Indonesia (1949–1950) | Tatengkeng | Jan Engelbert Tatengkeng | 27 December 1949 – 14 March 1950 |
| United States of Indonesia (1949–1950) | Diapari | Patuan Doli Diapari | 14 March 1950 – 10 May 1950 |
| United States of Indonesia (1949–1950) | Poetoehena | Martinus Putuhena | 10 May 1950 – 16 August 1950 |
| United States of Indonesia (1949–1950) | State of Pasundan (1948–1950) | | |
| United States of Indonesia (1949–1950) | Adil | Adil Puradiredja | 8 May 1948 – 10 January 1949 |
| United States of Indonesia (1949–1950) | First Djumhana | Djumhana Wiriaatmadja | 10 January 1949 – 31 January 1949 |
| United States of Indonesia (1949–1950) | Second Djumhana | Djumhana Wiriaatmadja | 31 January 1949 – 18 July 1949 |
| United States of Indonesia (1949–1950) | Third Djumhana | Djumhana Wiriaatmadja | 18 July 1949 – 11 January 1950 |
| United States of Indonesia (1949–1950) | Anwar | Anwar Tjokroaminoto | 11 January 1950 – 23 January 1950 |
| Liberal Democracy (1950–1959) | Natsir | Mohammad Natsir | 6 September 1950 – 27 April 1951 |
| Liberal Democracy (1950–1959) | Sukiman | Sukiman Wirjosandjojo | 27 April 1951 – 3 April 1952 |
| Liberal Democracy (1950–1959) | Wilopo | Wilopo | 3 April 1952 – 30 July 1953 |
| Liberal Democracy (1950–1959) | First Ali Sastroamidjojo | Ali Sastroamidjojo | 30 July 1953 – 12 August 1955 |
| Liberal Democracy (1950–1959) | Burhanuddin Harahap | Burhanuddin Harahap | 12 August 1955 – 24 March 1956 |
| Liberal Democracy (1950–1959) | Second Ali Sastroamidjojo | Ali Sastroamidjojo | 24 March 1956 – 9 April 1957 |
| Liberal Democracy (1950–1959) | Djuanda | Djuanda Kartawidjaja | 9 April 1957 – 10 July 1959 |
| Guided Democracy (1959–1966) | First Working | Sukarno | 10 July 1959 – 18 February 1960 |
| Guided Democracy (1959–1966) | Second Working | Sukarno | 18 February 1960 – 6 March 1962 |
| Guided Democracy (1959–1966) | Third Working | Sukarno | 8 March 1962 – 13 November 1963 |
| Guided Democracy (1959–1966) | Fourth Working | Sukarno | 23 November 1963 – 27 August 1964 |
| Guided Democracy (1959–1966) | Dwikora | Sukarno | 2 September 1964 – 21 February 1966 |
| Guided Democracy (1959–1966) | Revised Dwikora | Sukarno | 24 February 1966 – 27 March 1966 |
| Guided Democracy (1959–1966) | Second Revised Dwikora | Sukarno | 30 March 1966 – 25 July 1966 |
| Guided Democracy (1959–1966) | Ampera | Sukarno | 28 July 1966 – 12 March 1967 |
| Guided Democracy (1959–1966) | Ampera | Suharto | 12 March 1967 – 11 October 1967 |
| Guided Democracy (1959–1966) | Revised Ampera | Suharto | 14 October 1967 – 6 June 1968 |
| New Order (1966–1998) | First Development | Suharto | 10 June 1968 – 27 March 1973 |
| New Order (1966–1998) | Second Development | Suharto | 28 March 1973 – 29 March 1978 |
| New Order (1966–1998) | Third Development | Suharto | 31 March 1978 – 16 March 1983 |
| New Order (1966–1998) | Fourth Development | Suharto | 19 March 1983 – 21 March 1988 |
| New Order (1966–1998) | Fifth Development | Suharto | 23 March 1988 – 17 March 1993 |
| New Order (1966–1998) | Sixth Development | Suharto | 19 March 1993 – 11 March 1998 |
| New Order (1966–1998) | Seventh Development | Suharto | 16 March 1998 – 21 May 1998 |
| Reform Era (1998–present) | Development Reform | B. J. Habibie | 23 May 1998 – 20 October 1999 |
| Reform Era (1998–present) | National Unity | Abdurrahman Wahid | 29 October 1999 – 23 July 2001 |
| Reform Era (1998–present) | Mutual Assistance | Megawati Sukarnoputri | 10 August 2001 – 20 October 2004 |
| Reform Era (1998–present) | First United Indonesia | Susilo Bambang Yudhoyono | 21 October 2004 – 20 October 2009 |
| Reform Era (1998–present) | Second United Indonesia | Susilo Bambang Yudhoyono | 22 October 2009 – 20 October 2014 |
| Reform Era (1998–present) | Working | Joko Widodo | 27 October 2014 – 20 October 2019 |
| Reform Era (1998–present) | Onward Indonesia | Joko Widodo | 23 October 2019 – 20 October 2024 |
| Reform Era (1998–present) | Red and White | Prabowo Subianto | 21 October 2024 – Incumbent |
Source: Simanjuntak 2003

== Current cabinet ==
The present Indonesian cabinet, the Red White Cabinet (Indonesian: Kabinet Merah Putih), was sworn in on 21 October 2024. The cabinet consists of 7 Coordinating ministers and 41 ministers.

=== Coordinating ministers ===
| Office | Incumbent | Assumed office | Coordinated ministries and/or agencies | Party |
|---|---|---|---|---|
| Coordinating Ministry for Political and Security Affairs Kementerian Koordinator Bidang Politik dan Keamanan | Dudung Abdurachman | 1 October 2026 | Ministry of Home Affairs; Ministry of Foreign Affairs; Ministry of Defense; Ministry of Communication and Digital Affairs; Attorney General's Office; National Armed Forces; National Police | Independent |
| Coordinating Ministry for Legal, Human Rights, Immigration, and Correction Kementerian Koordinator Bidang Hukum, Hak Asasi Manusia, Imigrasi, dan Pemasyarakatan | Yusril Ihza Mahendra | 21 October 2024 | Ministry of Law; Ministry of Human Rights; Ministry of Immigration and Correction | PBB |
| Coordinating Ministry for Economic Affairs Kementerian Koordinator Bidang Perekonomian | Airlangga Hartarto (2nd term) | 21 October 2024 | Ministry of Industry; Ministry of Trade; Ministry of Manpower; Ministry of Tourism | Golkar |
| Coordinating Ministry for Infrastructure and Regional Development Kementerian Koordinator Bidang Infrastruktur dan Pembangunan Wilayah | Agus Harimurti Yudhoyono | 21 October 2024 | Ministry of Agrarian Affairs and Spatial Planning; Ministry of Transportation; Ministry of Public Works; Ministry of Housing and Residential Area; Ministry of Transmigration | Demokrat |
| Coordinating Ministry for Food Affairs Kementerian Koordinator Bidang Pangan | Zulkifli Hasan | 21 October 2024 | Ministry of Agriculture; Ministry of Marine Affairs and Fisheries; Ministry of Environment; Ministry of Forestry; National Food Agency; National Nutrition Agency | PAN |
| Coordinating Ministry for Human Development and Cultural Affairs Kementerian Koordinator Bidang Pembangunan Manusia dan Kebudayaan | Sugiono | 1 October 2026 | Ministry of Health; Ministry of Primary and Secondary Education; Ministry of Higher Education, Science, and Technology; Ministry of Cultural Affairs; Ministry of Religious Affairs; Ministry of Women Empowerment and Child Protection; Ministry of Population and Family Development; Ministry of Youth and Sports; Ministry of Hajj and Umrah | Gerindra |
| Coordinating Ministry for Social Empowerment Kementerian Koordinator Bidang Pemberdayaan Masyarakat | Muhaimin Iskandar | 21 October 2024 | Ministry of Social Affairs; Ministry of Indonesian Migrant Workers Protection; Ministry of Cooperatives; Ministry of Micro, Small, and Medium Enterprises; Ministry of Villages and Development of Disadvantaged Regions; Ministry of Creative Economy | PKB |
| Coordinating Ministry for Downstreaming and Energy Transition Kementerian Koordinator Bidang Hilirisasi dan Transisi Energi | Bahlil Lahadalia | 1 October 2026 | Ministry of Energy and Mineral Resources; Ministry of Investment and Downstream Industry | Golkar |

=== Ministers ===
| Office | Incumbent | Assumed office | Party |
|---|---|---|---|
| Ministry of State Secretariat; Kementerian Sekretariat Negara | Prasetyo Hadi | 21 October 2024 | Gerindra |
| Ministry of Home Affairs; Kementerian Dalam Negeri | Tito Karnavian (2nd term) | 21 October 2024 | Independent |
| Ministry of Foreign Affairs; Kementerian Luar Negeri | Arrmanatha Nasir | 1 October 2026 | Independent |
| Ministry of Defense; Kementerian Pertahanan | Sjafrie Sjamsoeddin | 21 October 2024 | Independent |
| Ministry of Law; Kementerian Hukum | Supratman Andi Agtas | 21 October 2024 | Gerindra |
| Ministry of Human Rights; Kementerian Hak Asasi Manusia | Natalius Pigai | 21 October 2024 | Independent |
| Ministry of Immigration and Correction; Kementerian Imigrasi dan Pemasyarakatan | Agus Andrianto | 21 October 2024 | Independent |
| Ministry of Finance; Kementerian Keuangan | Suahasil Nazara | 14 September 2026 | Independent |
| Ministry of Energy and Mineral Resources; Kementerian Energi dan Sumber Daya Mineral | Bahlil Lahadalia (2nd term) | 21 October 2024 | Golkar |
| Ministry of Industry; Kementerian Perindustrian | Muhammad Sarmuji | 1 October 2026 | Golkar |
| Ministry of Trade; Kementerian Perdagangan | Budi Santoso | 21 October 2024 | PAN |
| Ministry of Agriculture; Kementerian Pertanian | Amran Sulaiman (3rd term) | 21 October 2024 | Independent |
| Ministry of Environment / Environment Control Board; Kementerian Lingkungan Hidup / Badan Pengendalian Lingkungan Hidup | Jumhur Hidayat | 27 April 2026 | Independent |
| Ministry of Forestry; Kementerian Kehutanan | Raja Juli Antoni | 21 October 2024 | PSI |
| Ministry of Transportation; Kementerian Perhubungan | Dudy Purwagandhi | 21 October 2024 | PAN |
| Ministry of Marine Affairs and Fisheries; Kementerian Kelautan dan Perikanan | Sakti Wahyu Trenggono (2nd term) | 21 October 2024 | PAN |
| Ministry of Manpower; Kementerian Ketenagakerjaan | Yassierli | 21 October 2024 | Independent |
| Ministry of Villages and Development of Disadvantaged Regions; Kementerian Desa dan Pembangunan Daerah Tertinggal | Yandri Susanto | 21 October 2024 | PAN |
| Ministry of Transmigration; Kementerian Transmigrasi | Iftitah Sulaiman Suryanagara | 21 October 2024 | Demokrat |
| Ministry of Public Works; Kementerian Pekerjaan Umum | Dody Hanggodo | 21 October 2024 | Demokrat |
| Ministry of Housing and Residential Area; Kementerian Perumahan dan Kawasan Permukiman | Maruarar Sirait | 21 October 2024 | Gerindra |
| Ministry of Health; Kementerian Kesehatan | Budi Gunadi Sadikin (2nd term) | 21 October 2024 | Independent |
| Ministry of Primary and Secondary Education; Kementerian Pendidikan Dasar dan Menengah | Abdul Mu'ti | 21 October 2024 | Independent |
| Ministry of Higher Education, Science, and Technology; Kementerian Pendidikan Tinggi, Sains, dan Teknologi | Brian Yuliarto | 19 February 2025 | Independent |
| Ministry of Cultural Affairs; Kementerian Kebudayaan | Fadli Zon | 21 October 2024 | Gerindra |
| Ministry of Social Affairs; Kementerian Sosial | Saifullah Yusuf (2nd term) | 21 October 2024 | PKB |
| Ministry of Religious Affairs; Kementerian Agama | Nasaruddin Umar | 21 October 2024 | Independent |
| Ministry of Tourism; Kementerian Pariwisata | Widiyanti Putri | 21 October 2024 | Independent |
| Ministry of Creative Economy / Creative Economy Agency; Kementerian Ekonomi Kreatif / Badan Ekonomi Kreatif | Teuku Riefky Harsya | 21 October 2024 | Demokrat |
| Ministry of Communication and Digital Affairs; Kementerian Komunikasi dan Digital | Meutya Hafid | 21 October 2024 | Golkar |
| Ministry of Cooperatives; Kementerian Koperasi | Ferry Juliantono | 8 September 2025 | Gerindra |
| Ministry of Micro, Small, and Medium Enterprises; Kementerian Usaha Mikro, Kecil, dan Menengah | Maman Abdurrahman | 21 October 2024 | Golkar |
| Ministry of Women Empowerment and Child Protection; Kementerian Pemberdayaan Perempuan dan Perlindungan Anak | Arifah Choiri Fauzi | 21 October 2024 | Independent |
| Ministry of State Apparatus Utilization and Bureaucratic Reform; Kementerian Pendayagunaan Aparatur Negara dan Reformasi Birokrasi | Rini Widyantini | 21 October 2024 | Independent |
| Ministry of National Development Planning / National Development Planning Agency; Kementerian Perencanaan Pembangunan Nasional / Badan Perencanaan Pembangunan Nasional | Rachmat Pambudy | 21 October 2024 | Gerindra |
| Ministry of Agrarian Affairs and Spatial Planning / National Land Agency; Kementerian Agraria dan Tata Ruang / Badan Pertanahan Nasional | Nusron Wahid | 21 October 2024 | Golkar |
| Ministry of Youth and Sports; Kementerian Pemuda dan Olahraga | Erick Thohir | 17 September 2025 | Independent |
| Ministry of Investment and Downstream Industry / Investment Coordinating Board; Kementerian Investasi dan Hilirisasi / Badan Koordinasi Penanaman Modal | Rosan Roeslani (2nd term) | 21 October 2024 | Independent |
| Ministry of Indonesian Migrant Workers Protection / Indonesian Migrant Workers Protection Board; Kementerian Pelindungan Pekerja Migran / Badan Pelindungan Pekerja Migran | Mukhtarudin | 8 September 2025 | Golkar |
| Ministry of Population and Family Development / National Population and Family Planning Board; Kementerian Kependudukan dan Pembangunan Keluarga / Badan Kependudukan dan Keluarga Berencana Nasional | Wihaji | 21 October 2024 | Golkar |
| Ministry of Hajj and Umrah; Kementerian Haji dan Umrah | Mochamad Irfan Yusuf | 8 September 2025 | Gerindra |

=== Cabinet-level officials ===
| Portfolio | Incumbent Head | In office since | Portrait |
|---|---|---|---|
| Attorney General's Office Kejaksaan Agung Republik Indonesia | Attorney General Sanitiar Burhanuddin | 21 October 2024 | |
| National Armed Forces; Tentara Nasional Indonesia | Commander of National Armed Forces Agus Subiyanto | 22 November 2023 | |
| National Police; Kepolisian Negara Republik Indonesia | Chief of National Police Suyudi Ario Seto | 1 October 2026 | |
| State Intelligence Agency; Badan Intelijen Negara | Muhammad Herindra | 21 October 2024 | |
| Executive Office of the President; Kantor Staf Presiden Republik Indonesia | Ariyo Windutomo | 4 November 2026 | |
| Government Communications Agency; Badan Komunikasi Pemerintah | Syahganda Nainggolan | 2 October 2026 | |
| National Economics Council; Dewan Ekonomi Nasional | Luhut Binsar Pandjaitan | 21 October 2024 | |
| National Cyber and Crypto Agency; Badan Siber dan Sandi Negara | Nugroho Sulistyo Budi | 19 February 2025 | |
| Finance and Development Supervisory Agency; Badan Pengawasan Keuangan dan Pembangunan | Muhammad Yusuf Ateh | 19 February 2025 | |
| Central Agency of Statistics; Badan Pusat Statistik | Amalia Adininggar Widyasanti | 19 February 2025 | |
| Quarantine Agency; Badan Karantina Indonesia | Abdul Kadir Karding | 27 April 2026 | |

== See also ==
- List of female cabinet ministers of Indonesia
- List of longest-serving ministers in Indonesia
- List of government ministries of Indonesia
