= Cabinet of the State of East Indonesia =

Government apparatus

Cabinets of the State of East Indonesia Kabinet Negara Indonesia Timur
- 1st-8th Cabinet of East Indonesia
- 1947–1950
- Date formed: 13 January 1947
- Date dissolved: 16 August 1950

People and organisations
- Head of state: Tjokorda Gde Raka Soekawati
- Head of government: Nadjamuddin Daeng Malewa (Jan–Sep 1947); Semuel Jusof Warouw (Oct–Dec 1947); Ide Anak Agung Gde Agung (1947–1949); Jan Engelbert Tatengkeng (1949–1950); Patuan Doli Diapari (Mar–May 1950); Martinus Putuhena (May–Aug 1950)
- No. of ministers: 6 ministers (eighth and final cabinet)

History
- Successor: Natsir Cabinet

The Cabinet of the State of East Indonesia (Indonesian: Kabinet Negara Indonesia Timur) (Note: The cabinet was also referred to as the Council of Ministers (Dutch: Ministerraad; Indonesian: Dewan Menteri).) served as the central government apparatus of the State of East Indonesia (Indonesian: Negara Indonesia Timur), headed by a prime minister (Note: The prime minister was also referred to as the minister-president.) who were appointed by the head of state. During the three-year lifetime of the state between 24 December 1946 and 27 December 1949, there were eight cabinets in total, headed by six different prime ministers.

== Background ==
Following the end of World War II, Indonesian nationalists in the former Dutch East Indies, led by Sukarno and Mohammad Hatta, would proclaim Indonesian independence on 17 August 1945. This proclamation was not recognized by the Netherlands, however, and the Dutch sought to restore their power in Indonesia, resulting in the Indonesian National Revolution. The lieutenant governor-general of the Dutch East Indies, Hubertus van Mook, sought to establish a federation in Indonesia to protect Dutch economic interests. As part of this plan, van Mook organized the Malino Conference and Denpasar Conferences to form a state in what was then the governorate of the Great East (Groote Oost), resulting in the establishment of the State of East Indonesia (Negara Indonesia Timur, NIT) in December 1946.

== First Nadjamuddin cabinet (13 January 1947 – 2 June 1947) ==
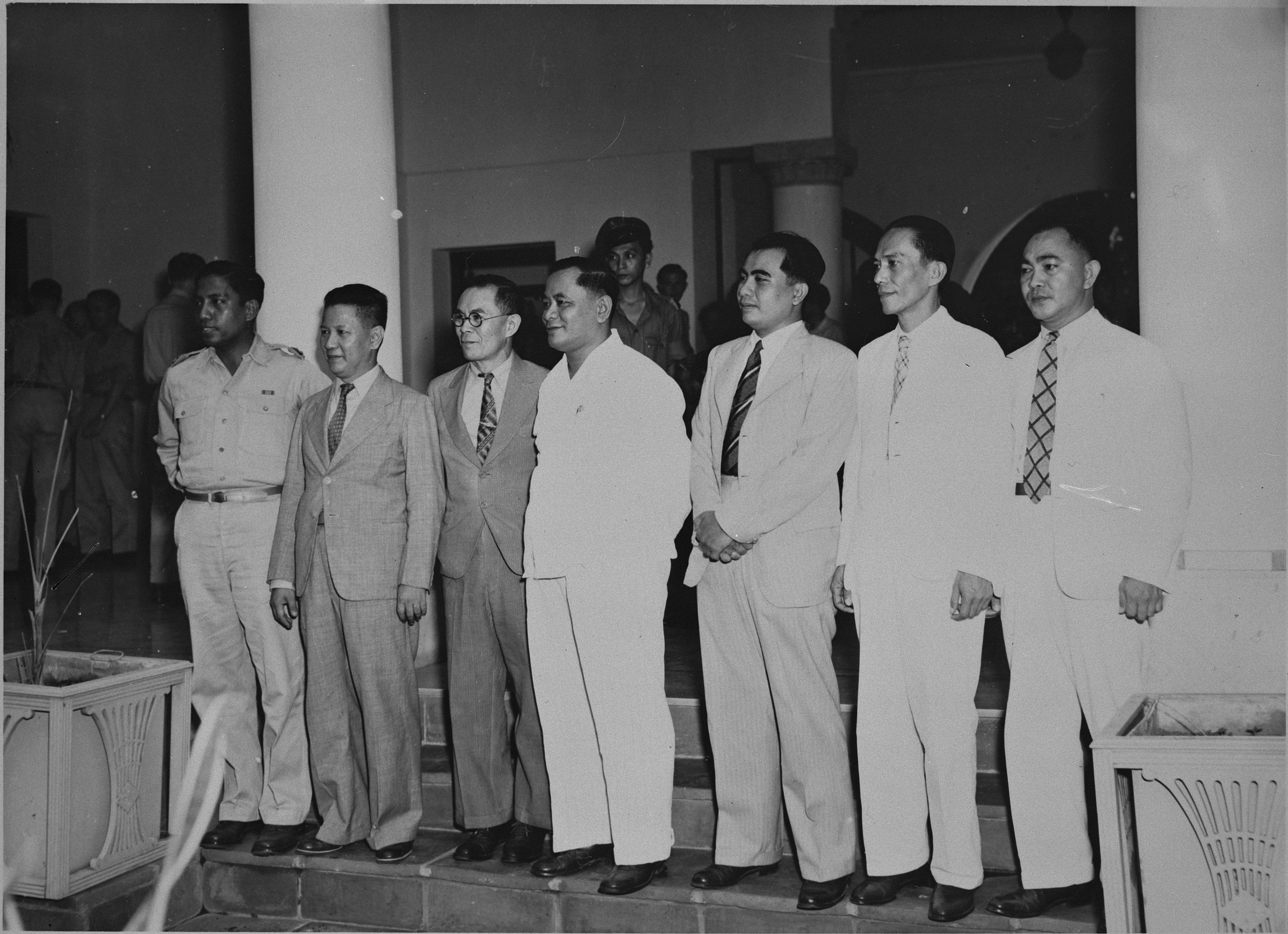
Inauguration of the First Malewa Cabinet in Jakarta (1947). From left to right: Julius Tahija, Minister of Social Affairs; Tjia Kok Tjiang, Minister of Justice; Elias Dumais Dengah, Minister of Transportation and Public Works; Nadjamuddin Daeng Malewa, Prime Minister and Minister of Economy; Ide Anak Agung Gde Agung, Minister of Home Affairs; dr. Semuel Jusof Warouw, Minister of Health; Godlief Rudolf Pantouw, Minister of Information.

At the Denpasar Conference (18-24 December 1946), the State of East Indonesia was established with Balinese noble Tjokorda Gde Raka Soekawati was elected head of state designated as president, and Nadjamuddin Daeng Malewa was appointed as prime minister-designate. Following discussions between the two men in Jakarta, the cabinet was announced and inaugurated on 13 January 1947 with the composition as follows:

Portfolio	Holder	Prior position
Prime Minister	Nadjamuddin Daeng Malewa	Trade Commissioner in Makassar
Economic Affairs	Nadjamuddin Daeng Malewa	Trade Commissioner in Makassar
Home Affairs	Ide Anak Agung Gde Agung	Raja of Gianyar
Justice	Tjia Kok Tjiang	Head of Law Department of the Residents' Office in Makassar
Finance	Mathijs Hamelink	Agent of the Bank of Java in Makassar
Education	Elvianus Katoppo	Superintendent of Elementary Education in Manado
Information	Godlief Rudolf Pantouw	Businessman in Makassar
Health	Semuel Jusof Warouw	Public physician with the government health bureau in Manado
Public Works and Transportation	Elias Dumais Dengah	Chairman of the Minahasa Council in Manado
Social Affairs	Julius Tahija	Military officer, adjutant to the commander of Dutch forces in Jakarta

As the provisional legislature had achieved very little in its first session, a number of its members proposed giving the cabinet unlimited powers to pass laws pending their later approval by the legislature. The cabinet would resign to allow the prime minister a free rein to make new appointments and form a cabinet with majority political support. Nadjamuddin Daeng Malewa held a series of meetings with political supporters and opponents in late May 1947 to decide on the composition of his revised cabinet.

== Second Nadjamuddin cabinet (2 June 1947 – 11 October 1947) ==
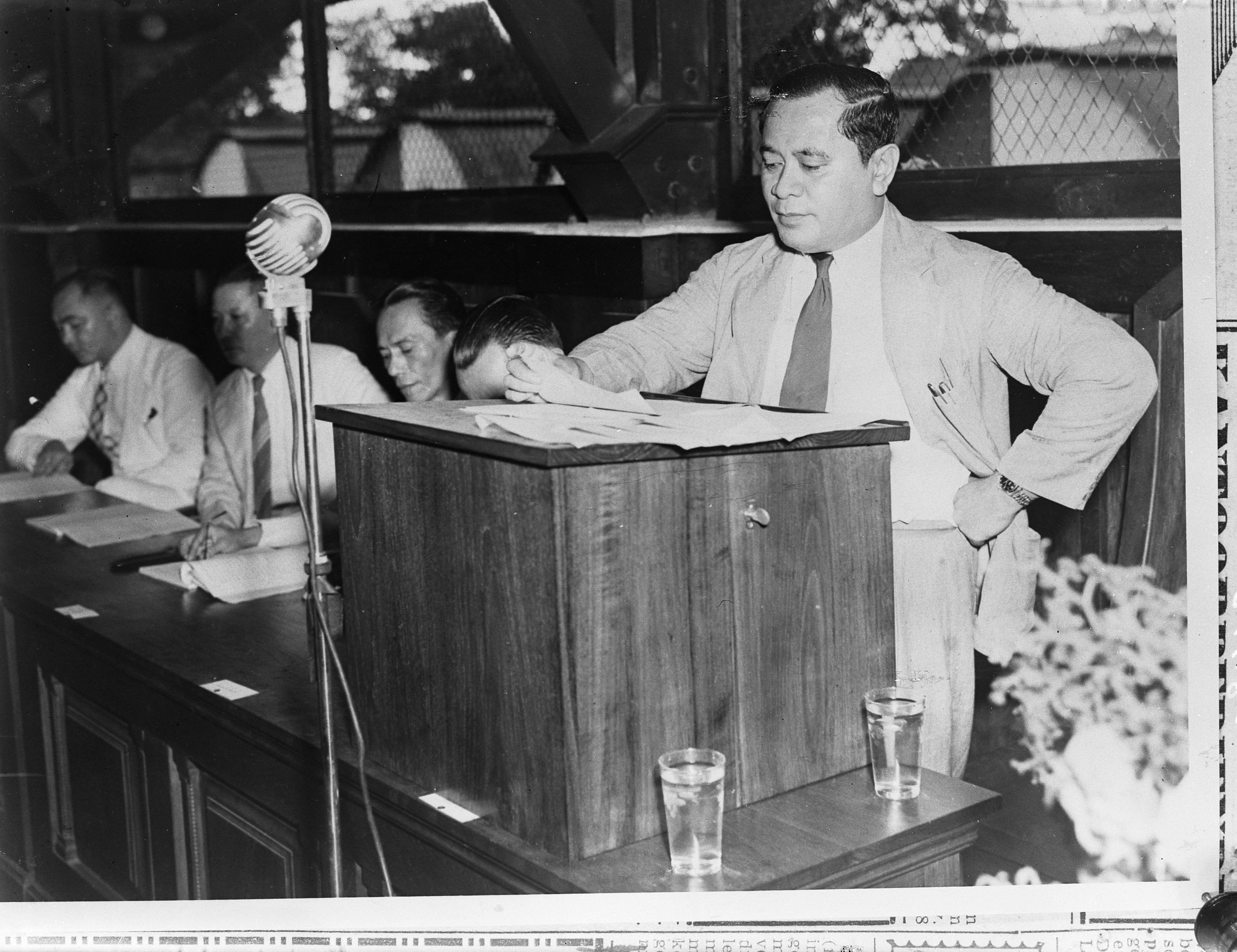
Nadjamuddin Daeng Malewa, first Prime Minister of East Indonesia.

The second cabinet, also headed by Nadjamuddin Daeng Malewa was announced on 31 May 1947. its composition was:

Portfolio	Holder
Prime Minister	Nadjamuddin Daeng Malewa
Economy (Minister)	Nadjamuddin Daeng Malewa
Deputy Prime Minister	Ide Anak Agung Gde Agung
Home Affairs	Ide Anak Agung Gde Agung
Justice	Christiaan Robbert Steven Soumokil
Finance	Mathijs Hamelink
Economy (Vice Minister)	Mathijs Hamelink
Finance (Vice Minister)	Rudolf Julianus 'Dolf' Metekohy
Education	Elvianus Katoppo
Information	Julius Tahija
Transportation and Public Works	Antonius Maximilian Semawi
Health	Semuel Jusof Warouw
Social Affairs	Godlief Rudolf Pantouw
Minister of State (Islamic affairs)	Achmad Sjehan Bachmid
Minister of State (Citizenship affairs)	Robert Cornelis Claproth
Minister of State (Judiciary affairs)	Tjia Kok Tjiang

In December 1947, Prime Minister Nadjamuddin Daeng Malewa was charged with corruption while he and president Soekawati were on an overseas visit, ending his term of office and his second cabinet.

== Warouw cabinet (11 October 1947 – 15 December 1947) ==
The Warouw Cabinet was formed on 10 October 1947 and sworn in the following day. Its composition was:

Portfolio	Holder
Prime Minister	Semuel Jusof Warouw
Health	Semuel Jusof Warouw
Deputy Prime Minister	Ide Anak Agung Gde Agung
Home Affairs	Ide Anak Agung Gde Agung
Justice	Christiaan Robbert Steven Soumokil
Finance	Mathijs Hamelink (Minister)
Finance	Rudolf Julianus 'Dolf' Metekohy (Vice Minister)
Transportation and Public Works	Antonius Maximilian Semawi
Education	Elvianus Katoppo
Information	Sonda Daeng Mattajang
Economy	Julius Tahija (Minister)
Economy	Hoesain Poeang Limboro (Vice Minister)
Social Affairs	Abdoellah Daeng Mappoedji (Minister)
Social Affairs	Tan Tek Heng (Vice Minister)

The politically inexperienced Prime Minister Warouw and his cabinet was accused of being overly supportive of the Dutch military offensive launched against the areas controlled by the Republicans in July 1947 during Operation Product, and was brought down by the Provisional Representative Body.

== First Gde Agung cabinet (15 December 1947 – 12 January 1949) ==
The first Gde Agung cabinet was sworn in on 15 December 1947. Its composition was as follows:

Portfolio	Holder
Prime Minister	Ide Anak Agung Gde Agung
Home Affairs	Ide Anak Agung Gde Agung (Minister)
Home Affairs	Sulaiman Binol (Vice Minister)
Justice	Christiaan Robbert Steven Soumokil (Minister)
Justice	Robert Cornelis Claproth (Vice Minister)
Economy	Hoesain Poeang Limboro (Minister)
Economy	Tan Tek Heng (Vice Minister)
Finance	Mathijs Hamelink (Minister)
Finance	Rudolf Julianus 'Dolf' Metekohy (Vice Minister)
Education	Elvianus Katoppo (Minister)
Education	Jan Engelbert Tatengkeng (Vice Minister)
Health	Semuel Jusof Warouw
Transportation and Public Works	Patuan Doli Diapari
Social Affairs	Saverius Supit Palenkahoe (Minister)
Social Affairs	Mohammad Sjafei (Vice Minister)
Information	Andi Burhanuddin (Minister)
Information	Izaak Huru Doko (Vice Minister)

This was the first cabinet to include supporters of the Indonesian Republic, and on 23 December 1947, it toned down the government's support for the July 1947 Dutch military action. At midnight on 19 December 1948, the Dutch launched another military attack against the Republic of Indonesia, codenamed Operation Kraai, and the First Gde Agung cabinet resigned in protest.

== Second Gde Agung cabinet (12 January 1949 – 27 December 1949) ==
The second Gde Agung cabinet was formed and sworn in on 12 January 1949. Its composition was as follows:

Portfolio	Holder
Prime Minister	Ide Anak Agung Gde Agung
Home Affairs	Ide Anak Agung Gde Agung
Justice	Christiaan Robbert Steven Soumokil
Economy	Tan Tek Heng (interim until 12 March 1949)
Economy	Abdul Rajab Daeng Massiki (from 12 March 1949)
Finance	Mathijs Hamelink
Education	Jan Engelbert Tatengkeng
Social Affairs	Sulaiman Binol
Health	Jan Willem Grootings
Public Works and Transportation	Patuan Doli Diapari
Information	Izaak Huru Doko
Minister of State (Budget Planning)	Tan Tek Heng (from 12 March 1949)

Following the transfer of sovereignty from the Netherlands to the United States of Indonesia (RUSI) a result of the Dutch–Indonesian Round Table Conference, prime minister Gde Agung was appointed foreign minister in the RUSI cabinet, and submitted his resignation as prime minister of East Indonesia.

== Tatengkeng cabinet (27 December 1949 – 14 March 1950) ==
The Tatengkeng cabinet was sworn in on 27 December 1949. Its composition was as follows:

Portfolio	Holder
Prime Minister	Jan Engelbert Tatengkeng
Education	Jan Engelbert Tatengkeng
Home Affairs	Iskandar Muhammad Jabir Syah of Ternate
Finance	Tan Tek Heng
Economy	Abdul Rajab Daeng Massiki
Information	Izaak Huru Doko
Social Affairs	Sulaiman Binol
Health (interim)	Sulaiman Binol
Public Works	Patuan Doli Diapari
Justice	Christiaan Robbert Steven Soumokil

Following elections, the provisional legislature was disbanded on 20 February 1950, and the cabinet also resigned. The following day, the elected representatives took their seats, while the Justice minister Chris Soumokil subsequently fled to Ambon and proclaimed the establishment of the Republic of South Maluku (RMS).

== Diapari cabinet (14 March 1950 – 10 May 1950) ==
The Diapari cabinet was sworn in on 14 March 1950 in the middle of the RMS Crisis. Its composition was as follows:

Portfolio	Holder
Prime Minister	Patuan Doli Diapari
Public Works and Transportation	Patuan Doli Diapari
Finance	Tan Tek Heng
Home Affairs	Abdul Rajab Daeng Massiki
Justice	Robert Cornelis Claproth
Economy	Achmad Ponsen Daeng Posanre
Education	Izaak Huru Doko
Social Affairs and Health	Daniel P. Tahitoe
Information	Willem Jozias Ratulangi

Since the elected parliament convened, it had been sharply divided between federalists, who supported the government of East Indonesia and the concept of the federal United States of Indonesia, and the opposition unitarians, who wanted a return to a unitary Indonesian republic. The two main federalist factions repeatedly called for the government to dismantle the State of East Indonesia, and subsequently one of the factions supporting the government called for the cabinet to resign and be replaced by one that was more broadly representative of the legislature. The motion was passed on 25 April, and the cabinet resigned. They remained in office as caretaker government until a new government could be formed.

On 2 May 1950, Prime Minister Diapari and several members of the cabinet, as well as some members of the Provisional Representative Body, were arrested and charged with conspiracy for being involved with Makassar Uprising involving Capt. Andi Aziz. None of them were charged any further and released from detention, as their involvement could not be proven.

== Putuhena cabinet (10 May 1950 – 16 August 1950) ==
The pro-republican Putuhena (or Poetoehena in older spelling) cabinet was tasked with making preparations for the integration of East Indonesia into a unitary Republic of Indonesia. Unlike previous prime ministers who were politicians of within East Indonesia, Martinus Putuhena was an Ambon-born federal official who were later posted in Makassar, serving as the civilian chair of the Territorial Military Commission. He was asked by president Soekawati to form a government after prime minister-designate Eliza Urbanus Pupella failed to form a government, all while the Diapari caretaker government were brought to halt.

Its composition was as follows:

Portfolio	Holder
Prime Minister	Martinus Putuhena
Transportation	Martinus Putuhena
Welfare	Martinus Putuhena
Home Affairs	Lanto Daeng Pasewang
Justice	I Gusti Ketut Pudja
Social Affairs	Andi Burhanuddin
Information	Henk Rondonoewoe
Education	Freddy Jaques Ingkiriwang
Health	Freddy Jaques Ingkiriwang
Finance	Abdoel Razak

On 19 May 1950, following negotiations between the United States of Indonesia (representing the State of East Indonesia and the State of East Sumatra) and the Republic of Indonesia, an agreement was reached to establish a unitary Indonesian state. This state was formed on 15 August 1950, and given that this meant the State of East Indonesia no longer existed, Putuhena and his cabinet resigned on 16 August.

== See also ==
- United States of Indonesia
- Indonesian National Revolution
