= G. R. Pantouw =

Indonesian politician and businessman (born 1910)

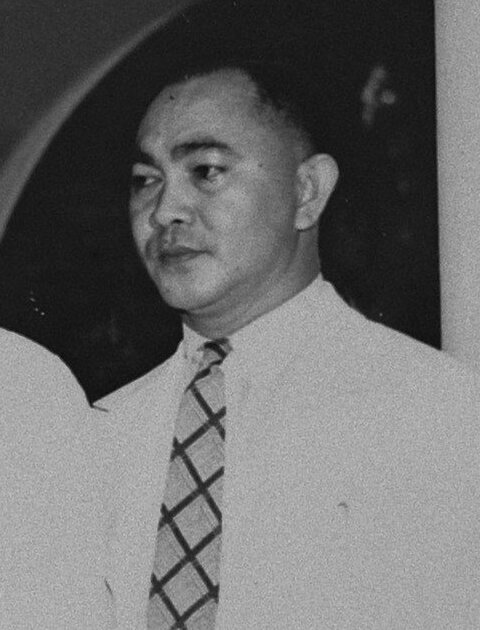
- Pantouw in 1947

Minister of Social Affairs
- In office 2 June 1947 – 11 October 1947
- Preceded by: Julius Tahija
- Succeeded by: Abdoellah Daeng Mappoedji

Minister of Information
- In office 13 January 1947 – 2 June 1947
- Preceded by: Office established
- Succeeded by: Julius Tahija

Personal details
- Born: 30 October 1910 Manado, Dutch East Indies

Godlief Rudolf Pantouw (born 30 October 1910) (Note: The place and date of his death, as well as his educational background, are unknown.) was an Indonesian politician and businessman of Minahasan descent. He served in the cabinet of the State of East Indonesia as minister of social affairs and minister of information in 1947. He was also active in the Indonesian nationalist movement, having been a member of various youth organizations. He later became a lecturer at Hasanuddin University.

== Early life and career ==
Godlief Rudolf Pantouw was born in Manado, a city in present-day North Sulawesi, on 30 October 1910. He was active in the Jong Minahasa youth organization and was one of its delegates to the second Youth Congress held on 27–28 October 1928. Pantouw was also active in the Indonesia Moeda association. During the 1930s, he worked as a teacher at the Pergoeroean Rakjat-School (lit. 'People's Education School') in Makassar. However, he was suspended and later banned from teaching by the Dutch East Indies government for having disturbed security and order. In 1938, he stood for a seat in the Manado Gemeenteraad (municipal council).

== Independence struggle ==
During the Japanese occupation of the Dutch East Indies (1941–1945), Pantouw joined another organization in Makassar, Syukai Gi In; it changed its name to Sumburan Darah Rakyat (Sudara, lit. 'Source of the People's Blood') following the surrender of Japan and the proclamation of Indonesian independence. Despite being active in organizations like Sudara and the People's Sovereignty Party, Pantouw decided to collaborate with the Dutch after realizing an inability to achieve much with the former. He joined the first cabinet of the Dutch-backed State of East Indonesia (Negara Indonesia Timur, NIT) in 1947, becoming minister of information under Prime Minister Nadjamuddin Daeng Malewa, a fellow nationalist.

As a minister, Pantouw was mainly concerned with tackling the social problems facing the Indonesian people. He was aware of the NIT's reputation as a Dutch puppet state, but was determined to use the state as a tool to push the Dutch into abandoning colonialism. He argued that "it was impossible for the newly proclaimed Republic of Indonesia — which had no power, no army, and no weapons in this part of the country — to fight the Dutch effectively" therefore joining the NIT was essential to advance the cause of Indonesian independence given the political conditions at the time. The revolution eventually came to an end in 1949, but nationalists continued their goal of disbanding the NIT and re-establishing a unitary state. The Makassar Uprising accelerated reunification talks and the NIT was dissolved into the republic in 1950.

== Later career ==
Pantouw became a lecturer at the Djakarta Journalist Academy in the 1950s, together with Parada Harahap and Sitor Situmorang. During the 1960s, he taught at the newly created College of Press and Publication, a private college for journalistic education, which was merged into Hasanuddin University. Thereafter, he served as head of the university's journalism study program.
