= Anak Agung Gde Agung =

Anak Agung Gde Agung may refer to:

- Anak Agung Gde Agung (academician), Indonesian businessman, politician, teacher and nobleman
- Anak Agung Gde Mayun (born 1960), Indonesian politician and Vice Regent of Gianyar
- Anak Agung Gde Agung (politician) (born 1949), Indonesian politician and Regent of Bandung (2005–2015)
- Ide Anak Agung Gde Agung (1921–1999), Indonesian politician, diplomat, historian and Raja of Gianyar, Bali
