= Julius Tahija =

Indonesian businessman, politician and soldier

Julius Tahija RMWO
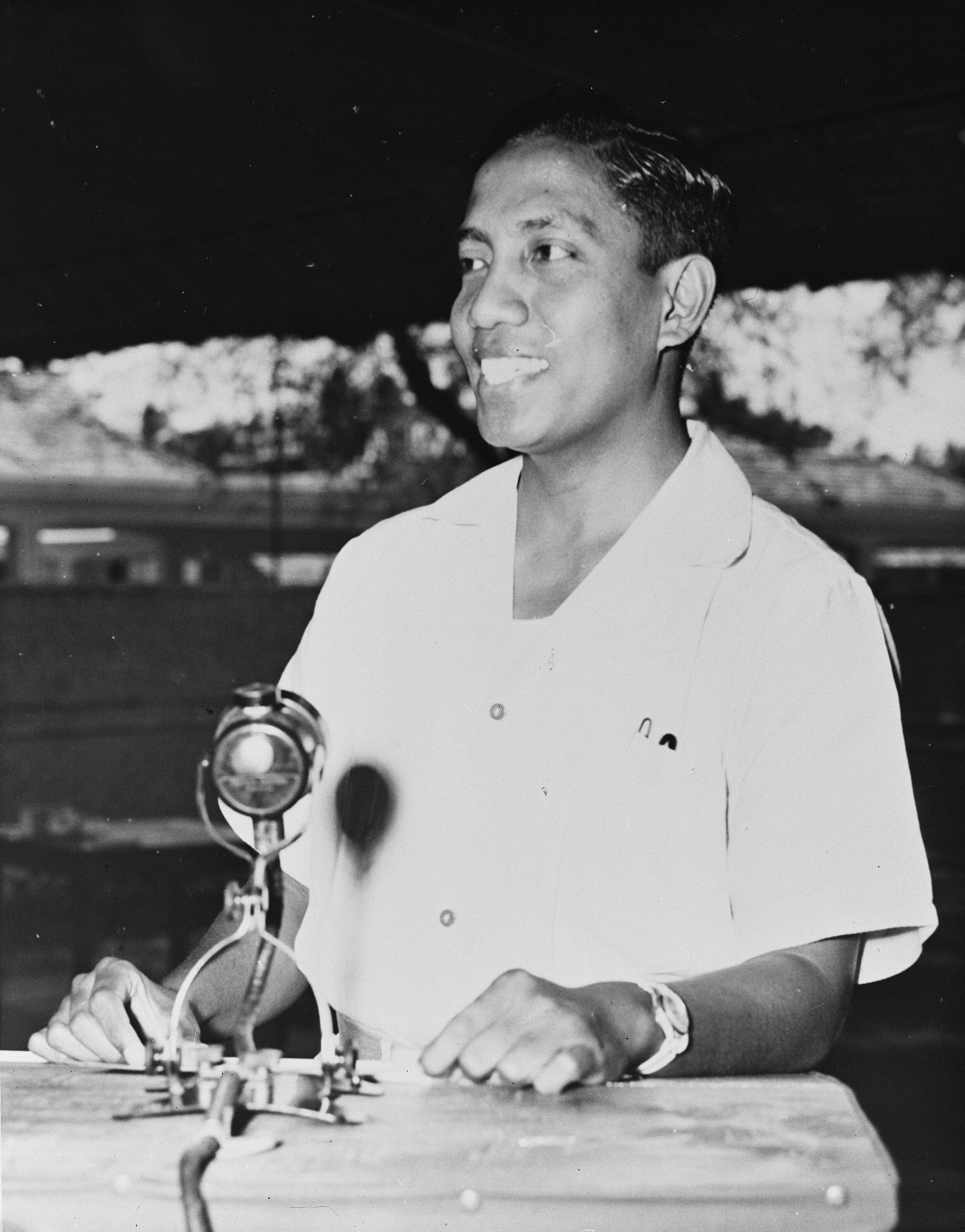
- Tahija in 1947

Minister of Economy
- In office 11 October 1947 – 15 December 1947
- Prime Minister: Semuel Jusof Warouw
- Preceded by: Nadjamuddin Daeng Malewa
- Succeeded by: Husein Puang Limboro

Minister of Information
- In office 2 June 1947 – 11 October 1947
- Prime Minister: Nadjamuddin Daeng Malewa
- Preceded by: G. R. Pantouw
- Succeeded by: Sonda Daeng Mattajang

Minister of Social Affairs
- In office 13 January 1947 – 2 June 1947
- Prime Minister: Nadjamuddin Daeng Malewa
- Preceded by: position created
- Succeeded by: G.R. Pantouw

Personal details
- Born: 13 July 1916 Surabaya, Dutch East Indies
- Died: 30 July 2002 (aged 86) Jakarta, Indonesia
- Spouse: Jean Tahija
- Children: 2

Military service
- Allegiance: Netherlands (1937–1949); Indonesia (1949–1951)
- Branch/service: KNIL; Z Special Unit
- Years of service: 1937–1951
- Rank: Lieutenant colonel

Julius Tahija (13 July 1916 – 30 July 2002) was an Indonesian businessman, politician and soldier. He was a recipient of the Military Order of William for his actions in the Dutch East Indies campaign while serving in the Royal Netherlands East Indies Army and was the only Indonesian in the war to receive a highest military honor from an allied country during World War II. He briefly held various cabinet posts in the State of East Indonesia during the Indonesian National Revolution in 1947 and later worked for and established the Indrapura conglomerate which became one of the largest in the country.

== Early life and education ==
Tahija was born in Surabaya, then part of Dutch East Indies, on 13 July 1916. Tahija was of Ambonese descent. Due to his father's efforts, Tahija received Dutch education at the Handels School (trading school), as he had initially intended to pursue a career in business.

== Military and political career ==
In 1937, Tahija joined the Royal Netherlands East Indies Army (KNIL). He initially received training as a pilot, but was transferred to infantry – according to Tahija, he believed that this was due to his uncle's pro-independence views. He saw action in Aceh before World War II.

=== World War II ===
Following the outbreak of the Pacific War, he was dispatched to Australia to escort a group of Japanese civilians interned there. After the beginning of the Dutch East Indies campaign, Tahija (then a sergeant) volunteered to lead a group of Indonesian soldiers on an intelligence gathering mission to Saumlaki in the Tanimbar Islands. According to Tahija's accounts, he arrested several Japanese spies and discovered that Japanese forces were about to stage a landing on the island. After setting up some trenches with the help of local officials, the group ambushed the Japanese soldiers who landed before dawn, with around eighty Japanese soldiers killed before Tahija and his party retreated into the jungle. The group – which had been reduced from thirteen to seven men – managed to secure a schooner and sailed back to Australia's Bathurst Island with 27 (including local officials and other civilians) on board. He was later bestowed with a Military Order of William, fourth class award in August 1942 for the Saumlaki action, the only Indonesian to receive the highest military decoration from an allied nation during WWII. His six surviving comrades also received other awards.

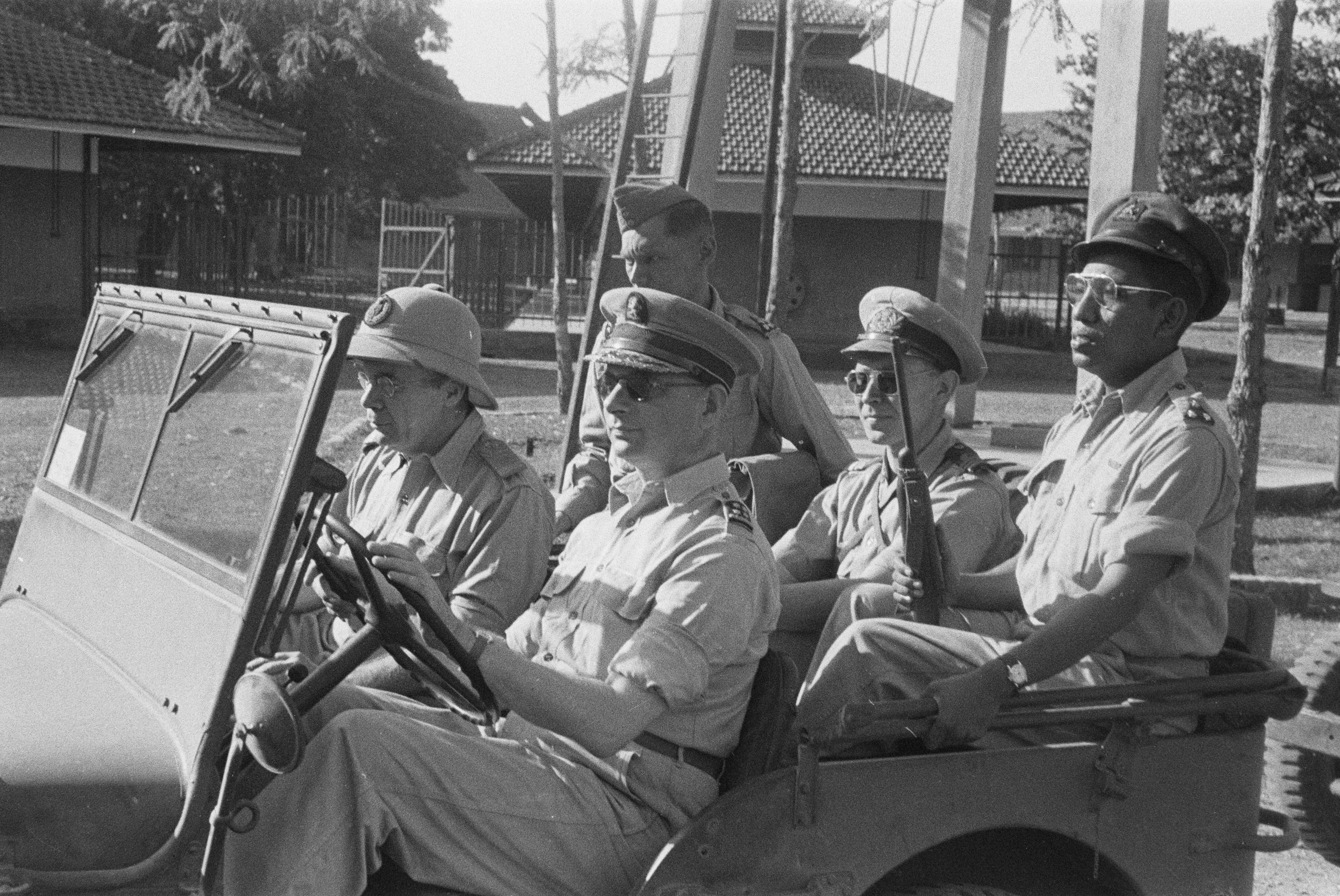
Tahija (far right) with Simon Spoor and Hubertus van Mook in 1947

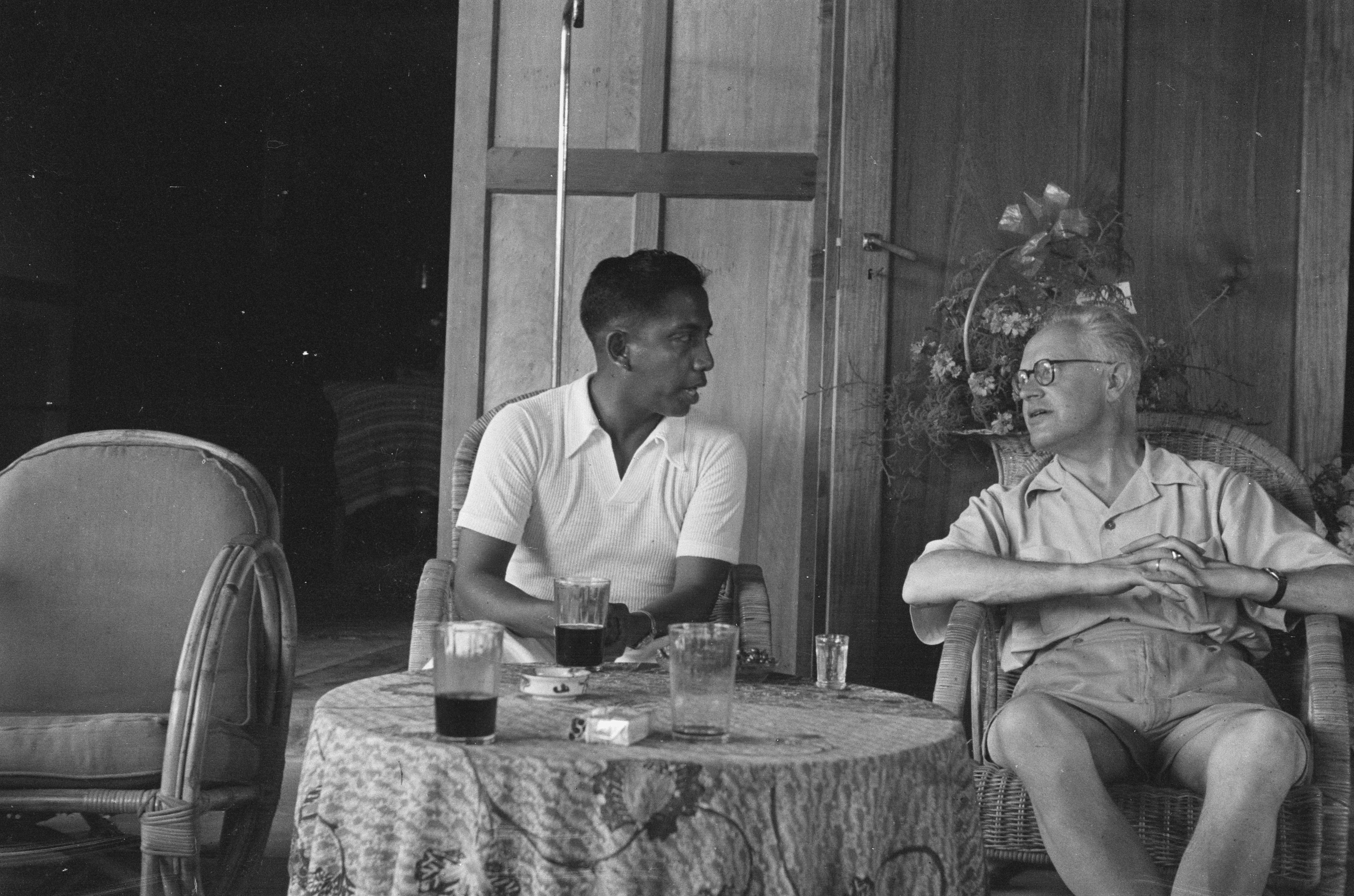
Tahija (left) as Minister of Social Affairs, meeting Dutch politician Carl Romme in 1947

Later, he was promoted to lieutenant and served in American general Charles A. Willoughby's unit, operating behind Japanese lines as part of the Z Special Unit – such as Operation Firetree in February 1945 – and engaging in various intelligence operations to Indonesian islands in addition to training new volunteers. During his time in Australia, he met and began to date Victoria-born dentist Jean Walters, and the two later married in 1946.

=== Indonesian Revolution ===
During the Indonesian National Revolution, Tahija was the adjutant of Simon Spoor. Despite his position, he maintained good personal relationships with nationalist leaders, especially Sutan Sjahrir. Between 1946 and 1949, he also played a part in the formation of the State of East Indonesia (NIT). He was one of the candidates for chair of the state's first provisional legislature, though he was defeated in the leadership vote by Tadjoeddin Noor. He also served in the Cabinet of the State of East Indonesia, where he initially was made Minister of Social Affairs under Nadjamuddin Daeng Malewa's first cabinet, and later taking up the post of Minister of Information in Malewa's second cabinet between 2 June and 11 October 1947. His next cabinet post was the Minister of Economy between 11 October and 15 December 1947 in S.J. Warrouw's cabinet. He then became head of NIT's representative office in Jakarta. Journalist Rosihan Anwar wrote that Tahija approved of the 1947 Dutch offensive against the Indonesian nationalist forces, but disapproved of the second, 1948 offensive.

He attended the Dutch–Indonesian Round Table Conference as a representative of the Federal Consultative Assembly (BFO). Following the conclusion of the conference and the recognition of Indonesian sovereignty, Tahija transferred to the Armed Forces of the United States of Indonesia (Angkatan Perang Republik Indonesia Serikat/APRIS) as a lieutenant colonel. During his service at APRIS – later the Indonesian National Armed Forces – he gave advice to the Indonesian government during military operations against the Republic of South Maluku and was assigned under Ahmad Yani in a mission to purchase arms. He resigned from military service in 1951.

== Business career ==
After leaving military service, Tahija was introduced to Caltex by an acquaintance in the U.S. Army. Tahija himself noted that he "learned to be a manager" at the company, and he eventually became the managing director of the Indonesian branch of the company on 1971, a position he held for six years. During this time, he also engaged in business activities outside Caltex – which he had explicitly requested to be permitted for in his contract of employment. During his time at the company, Tahija's links with Sukarno spared Caltex from the nationalization of foreign companies conducted by the Indonesian government in the 1950s.

Tahija's companies operated under a conglomerate, known as the Indrapura group. The group was centered around an insurance company with the same name which was one of the largest in Indonesia during the 1950s. In 1955, Tahija founded Bank Niaga in a partnership with Soedarpo Sastrosatomo. By 1972, Tahija's group had become the bank's main shareholder, until it sold a controlling 40 percent stake to Hashim Djojohadikusumo in 1997 for Rp 605 billion (US$232.3 million at the time).

Following Suharto's takeover of the presidency, Tahija maintained his influence, and he was given some interest in the newly established Grasberg mine of Freeport-McMoRan after he approached the company to negotiate with the Indonesian government in 1965. Later on, he was part of a joint venture to provide power for the mine with a 10 percent stake in Puncak Jaya Power. By 1994, Indrapura group was Indonesia's ninth-largest conglomerate by asset and 25th in terms of revenue. It was also the largest conglomerate held by "indigenous" Indonesians in terms of assets, the value of which was estimated at US$2.9 billion in 1994.

Aside from his conglomerate, Tahija at some point served as the chairman of Trisakti University, became a trustee for the World Wildlife Fund, and joined the business advisory council of the International Finance Corporation. President Suharto awarded him with the Bintang Mahaputra Nararya in 1994.

== Later life and death ==
Tahija and his wife founded the charitable Tahija Foundation in 1990, which works on health, education, culture, environment and social services. He was also made an honorary member of the Order of Australia in February 2002 for "service to Australian-Indonesian business relations". Anwar wrote that in their last encounter, Tahija had said to Anwar:

Rosihan, people like us from the revolution era, have jij ever considered that our country would be in the state that it is in today?

Tahija died in Jakarta on 30 July 2002, at the age of 86. At the time of his death, he had two sons. He was buried next to his wife in Puncak, West Java.

== Bibliography ==
- Agung, Ide Anak Agung Gde (1996). From the Formation of the State of East Indonesia Towards the Establishment of the United States of Indonesia. Yayasan Obor Indonesia. ISBN 9789794612163.
- Brawley, Sean (July 2012). "The 'Spirit of Berrington House'". Indonesia and the Malay World. 40 (117): 175–192. doi:10.1080/13639811.2012.683669. S2CID 142941074.
- Gardner, Paul F. (1997). Shared Hopes, Separate Fears: Fifty Years Of U.S.-Indonesian Relations. University of Pennsylvania Press. ISBN 9780813331904.
- Hogenboom, Barbara; Jilberto, Alex E. Fernández (2006). Big Business and Economic Development: Conglomerates and Economic Groups in Developing Countries and Transition Economies Under Globalisation. Routledge. p. 68. ISBN 9781134125760.
- Leith, Denise (2003). The Politics of Power: Freeport in Suharto's Indonesia. University of Hawaii Press. ISBN 9780824825669.
