= Pupella =

Pupella may refer to:

- Eliza Urbanus Pupella, Indonesian journalist and nationalist leader
- Mario Pupella, Italian actor
- Pupella Maggio, Italian actress
