= Izaak Huru Doko =

National Hero of Indonesia

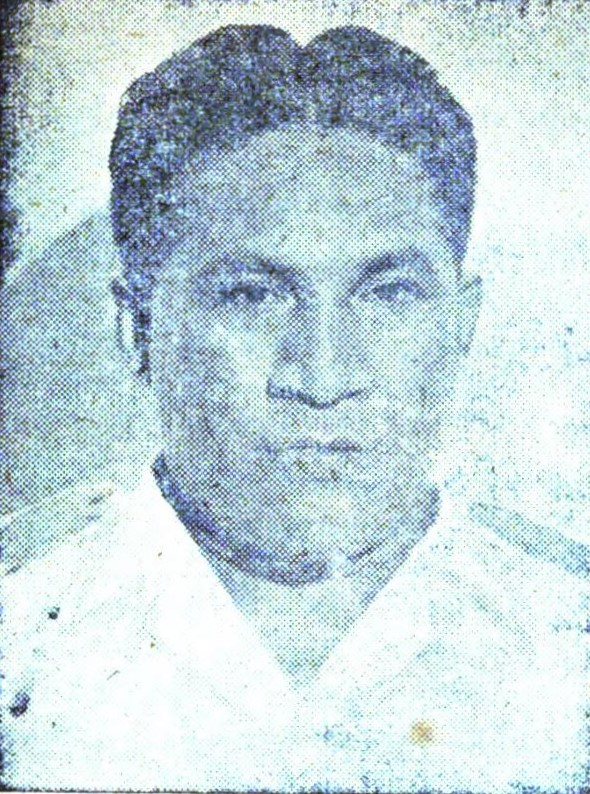

Deputy Minister of Information of East Indonesia
- In office 15 December 1947 – 12 January 1949
- Preceded by: R. Claproth
- Succeeded by: office abolished

Minister of Information of East Indonesia
- In office 12 January 1949 – 14 March 1950
- Preceded by: Burhanuddin
- Succeeded by: W. J. Ratulangi

Minister of Education of East Indonesia
- In office 14 March 1950 – 10 May 1950
- Preceded by: Jan Engelbert Tatengkeng
- Succeeded by: Ingkiriwang

Personal details
- Born: 20 November 1913 Savu, Kupang, Timor, Dutch East Indies
- Died: 29 July 1985 (aged 71) Kupang, East Nusa Tenggara, Indonesia

Izaak Huru Doko (also Izaac; 20 November 1913 – 29 July 1985) was a Timorese National Hero of Indonesia. He received this title on 3 November 2006.

== Biography ==
Doko was born in Sabu, Kupang, Timor, on 20 November 1913. He completed his primary education at Dutch-run schools in Kupang before going to Bandung, West Java, to study at a school for teachers. There he met Herman Johannes, with whom he established the organisation Timorsche Jongeren (Young Timorese). He also founded political party called "Perserikatan Kebangsaan Timor" in Kupang, with the goal of Indonesian independence.

During the Japanese occupation, following the overthrow of the Dutch colonial government, he was hired as the leader of Bunkyo Kakari in Kupang from 1 March 1942, a position he held until 1945. Doko wrote extensively on the condition of the Timorese people in Timor Syuho newspaper; he also represented his people in a Japanese-run local government. On 17 August 1945, following Japan's defeat in the Pacific, Indonesia proclaimed its independence. During the ensuing revolution, Doko alongside Tom Gerson Pello organised Timorese youth to put up an armed struggle against the invading Dutch forces. He was chosen as Adviseur, Timorese delegations in Malino Conference. He advocated for the removal of Korte Verklaring from all the region and united under Republic of Indonesia.

After the Dutch recognised Indonesia's independence in 1949, Doko organised the Indonesian Democracy Party (Partai Demokrasi Indonesia). He became parliament member for State of East Indonesia and eventually minister of information. He spoke out extensively against the formation of an independent State of East Indonesia. During Permesta rebellion, forces under Kawilarang took control of Makassar. He was imprisoned in Sungguminasa although eventually freed. He also helped establish Udayana University in Denpasar, Bali, and the University of Nusa Cendana in Kupang. He served as a school supervisor in Timor from the 1950s and worked at building educational infrastructure in that area. For this, he spent eight months in Australia in 1958, learning about different school systems which could be used. In the 1970s he was head of the Timorese office of the Ministry of Education and Culture.

Doko died on 29 July 1985. On 3 November 2006 he was granted the title National Hero of Indonesia by President Susilo Bambang Yudhoyono. A street in Kupang is named after him.

== Works cited ==
- Mirnawati (2012). Kumpulan Pahlawan Indonesia Terlengkap [Most Complete Collection of Indonesian Heroes] (in Indonesian). Jakarta: CIF. ISBN 978-979-788-343-0.
- Sudarmanto, J. B. (2007). Jejak-Jejak Pahlawan: Perekat Kesatuan Bangsa Indonesia [Footsteps of the Heroes: Uniting the Indonesian People] (in Indonesian). Jakarta: Grasindo. ISBN 978-979-759-716-0.
