= Binol =

Binol or BINOL can refer to:

- 1,1′-Bi-2-naphthol, symmetrical organic compound
- Sulaiman Binol (1911–1993), Indonesian diplomat and lawyer

== See also ==
- Binol-anon, Cebuano dialect
