= United States of Indonesia Cabinet =

Cabinet of the United States of Indonesia (1949–1950)

United States of Indonesia Cabinet Kabinet Republik Indonesia Serikat
- Cabinet of Indonesia
- 20 December 1949 – 6 September 1950
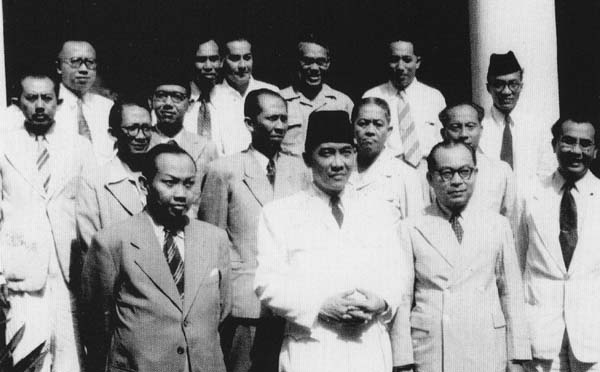
- Members of the cabinet with President Sukarno
- Date formed: 20 December 1949
- Date dissolved: 6 September 1950

People and organisations
- President: Sukarno
- Prime Minister: Mohammad Hatta
- Member parties: Masyumi; PNI; Parkindo

History
- Predecessor: Hatta II
- Successor: Natsir

The United States of Indonesia Cabinet (Indonesian: Kabinet Republik Indonesia Serikat) was established as a result of the formation of the United States of Indonesia following the transfer of sovereignty from the Dutch colonial power. It lasted less than a year before Indonesia became a unitary state.

== Background ==
President Sukarno, the president of the United States of Indonesia, appointed Mohammad Hatta, Ida Anak Agung Gde Agung, Sri Sultan Hamengku Buwono IX and Sultan Hamid II to choose the cabinet of the new country. Two days later, on 20 December 1949, the cabinet was sworn in, and a week later formally accepted the sovereignty of the nation from the Dutch.

== Composition ==
Only five cabinet members came from the outside the federal state of the Republic of Indonesia. Hatta worked hard to ensure that ministers were appointed based on competence, rather than party affiliation, and four of the ministers from the Republic of Indonesia did not belong to any party. In practice, Hatta had a very dominant position in the cabinet, due to his close relationship with Sukarno, his success at the Dutch–Indonesian Round Table Conference and his role during key events during the War of Independence.

Portfolio	Holder	Party	Origin
Prime Minister
Prime Minister	Mohammad Hatta	Non-party	Republic of Indonesia
Departmental Ministers
Home Affairs	Ida Anak Agung Gde Agung	Non-party	East Indonesia
Foreign Affairs	Mohammad Hatta	Non-party	Republic of Indonesia
Defense	Sri Sultan Hamengkubuwana IX	Non-party	Republic of Indonesia
Justice	Soepomo	Non-party	Republic of Indonesia
Finance	Sjafruddin Prawiranegara	Masyumi	Republic of Indonesia
Education and Culture	Abu Hanifah	Masyumi	Republic of Indonesia
Health	Johannes Leimena	Parkindo	Republic of Indonesia
Social Affairs	Moh. Kosasih Purwanegara	Non-party	Pasundan
Information	Arnold Mononutu	Indonesian National Party (PNI)	East indonesia
Transportation, Power, and Public Works	Herling Laoh	PNI	Republic of Indonesia
Welfare	Djuanda	Non-party	Republic of Indonesia
Labor	Wilopo	PNI	Republic of Indonesia
Religious Affairs	Wahid Hasyim	Masyumi	Republic of Indonesia
State Ministers
State Minister	Sultan Hamid II	Non-party	West Kalimantan
State Minister	Mohamad Roem	Masyumi	Republic of Indonesia
State Minister	Soeparno Honggopati Tjitrohoepojo	Non-party	Madoera

== Changes ==
On 19 January 1950, State Minister Moh. Roem was appointed to the RUSI High Commission in The Hague and resigned from the cabinet. Following a report from the attorney general, State Minister Sultan Hamid II was dismissed on 5 April 1950 for involvement in the rebellion led by Raymond Westerling. Neither of these state ministers were replaced.

== The end of the cabinet ==
On 15 August 1950, the United States of Indonesia ceased to exist and was replaced by the unitary state of Indonesia. On the same day, Prime Minister Hatta returned his mandate to President Sukarno. The Republic of the United States of Indonesia Cabinet was officially dissolved but continued as the cabinet of the Republic of Indonesia until a new cabinet could be formed.
