= Sulaiman Binol =

Indonesian diplomat (1911–1993)

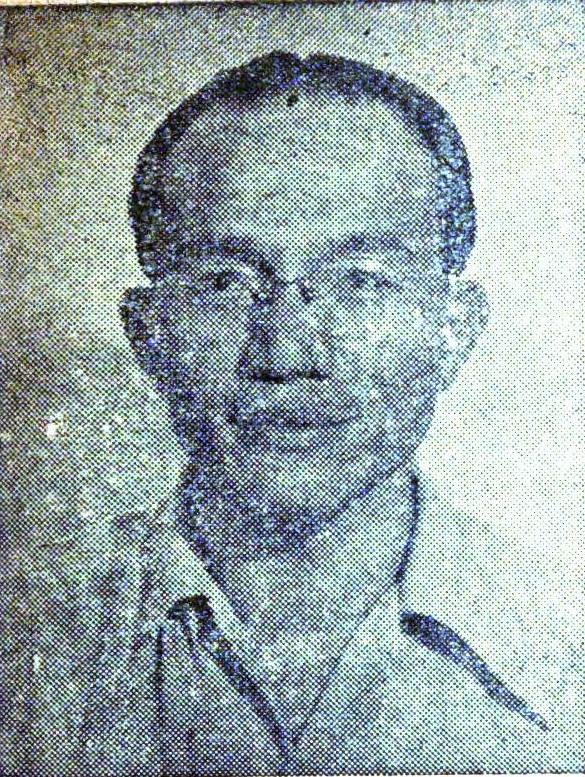
- Binol, c. 1949

Minister of Social Affairs of East Indonesia
- In office 12 January 1949 – 14 March 1950
- Prime Minister: Ide Anak Agung Gde Agung; Jan Engelbert Tatengkeng
- Preceded by: Saverius Supit Pelenkahu
- Succeeded by: Daniel P. Tahitoe

Personal details
- Born: 12 August 1911 Buol, Dutch East Indies
- Died: 5 September 1993 (aged 82)

Sulaiman Binol (EVO: Soelaiman Binol; 12 August 1911 – 5 September 1993) was an Indonesian diplomat and lawyer. After serving as a judge during the Japanese occupation of Indonesia, he served as the Minister of Social Affairs in the State of East Indonesia from 1949 to 1950, and in various diplomatic postings from 1950 to 1957, including in New Delhi, Tokyo, and London. He resigned from the foreign service in 1965, and worked as a translator and lawyer in Jakarta afterwards.

== Early life ==
Sulaiman Binol was born on 12 August 1911 in the village of Bunobogu, in present-day Buol Regency. His father, Raja Binol, was a merchant and founder of the Buol branch of Sarekat Islam, while his mother Siti Rapiah originated from Bunobogu. By 1919, Binol had moved to the colonial capital of Batavia where he began his education at an indigenous school (Hollandsch-Inlandsche School). He graduated from a high school in Batavia (Algemene middelbare school) in 1933, and worked for a time as an administrative assistant for the colonial government before enrolling at the Batavia Law School (RHS) in 1936. He graduated from RHS in 1942.

== Career ==
=== In Makassar ===
During the Japanese occupation of Indonesia, Binol worked as a judge at the lower court (landraad) in Makassar. After the Japanese defeat, Binol attended the Denpasar Conference in 1946. Upon the formation of the State of East Indonesia, Binol became a member of its provisional lower house representing South Sulawesi. He would be elected as vice-chair of the house in April 1947. Binol was associated with a "progressive faction" within the house, and led a walkout from the house following the removal of the house's chair Tadjuddin Noor in May 1947. During this time, he also advised the Dutch delegation to the United Nations.

In December 1947, Binol was appointed as Vice Minister of Home Affairs in the cabinet of Ide Anak Agung Gde Agung (who concurrently served as minister of home affairs). He served in this position until Agung reformed his cabinet on 12 January 1949, and Binol instead became Minister of Social Affairs. When Agung was appointed foreign minister in the United States of Indonesia in December 1949, he resigned as prime minister, and Binol retained his office as Social Affairs minister in the ensuing cabinet under Jan Engelbert Tatengkeng while concurrently serving as interim health minister until 14 March 1950.

=== Diplomat ===
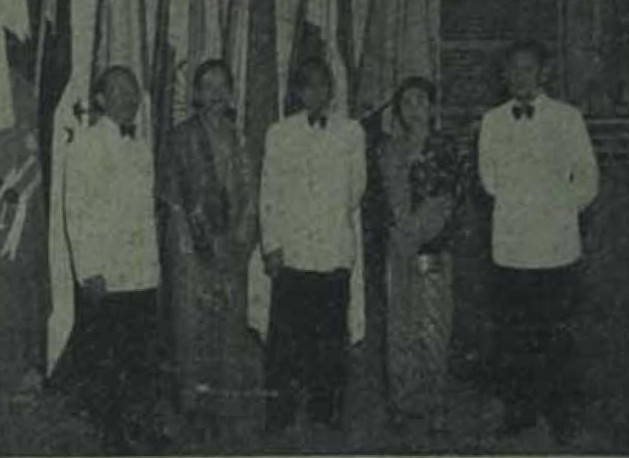
Binol (left) with other Indonesian diplomats in New Delhi, 1951.

After the dissolution of East Indonesia, Binol joined the Ministry of Foreign Affairs. His first posting was in New Delhi, where he was appointed to the Indonesian embassy with the diplomatic rank of first secretary in 1950. In this capacity, he was part of the Indonesian delegation in a conference in Colombo in December 1950 related to Southeast Asian affairs. In 1953, Binol was appointed as consul-general of Indonesia in Tokyo. The Berita Indonesia newspaper claimed that Binol's Tokyo appointment was a result of lobbying by Binol's wife and the wife of former foreign minister Achmad Soebardjo.

In the leadup to the Bandung Conference in 1955, he would invite Japanese representatives to the conference, formally inviting the Japanese foreign minister Mamoru Shigemitsu in January 1955. His next posting was at the Indonesian Embassy in London, where he was appointed as the second-in-command of the embassy and the principal deputy to ambassador Soepomo with the rank of minister counsellor. He served until 1957 and returned to Indonesia that year, taking a post at the foreign ministry as deputy chief of the United Nations directorate until he resigned from the ministry in 1965.

== Later career and death ==
After his time as a diplomat, Binol worked as an employee at the Embassy of the United Kingdom in Jakarta from 1966 to 1974. Binol also returned to legal practice, becoming a lawyer at the Jakarta High Court and a sworn translator. He translated a number of Dutch legal texts into Indonesian.

He died on 5 September 1993, and was buried at the Tanah Kusir Cemetery in Jakarta.
