= Operation Firetree =

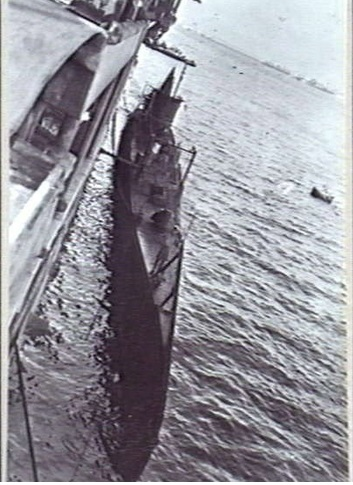
HNLMS K XV

Operation Firetree was a World War II operation by the Netherlands East Indies Forces Intelligence Service in February 1945. The Dutch submarine HNLMS K XV unsuccessfully tried five times to land the NEFIS shore party 'Firetree' (five men) at the coast of the Soela Islands. The shore party was under the command of First Lieutenant Julius Tahija.

On 5 and 7 March 1945 the K XV unsuccessfully tried two times to land the NEFIS shore party 'Poppy' at the coast of the Wijnskoopbaai, south coast of Java.
