= Eliza Urbanus Pupella =

Indonesian journalist and nationalist leader

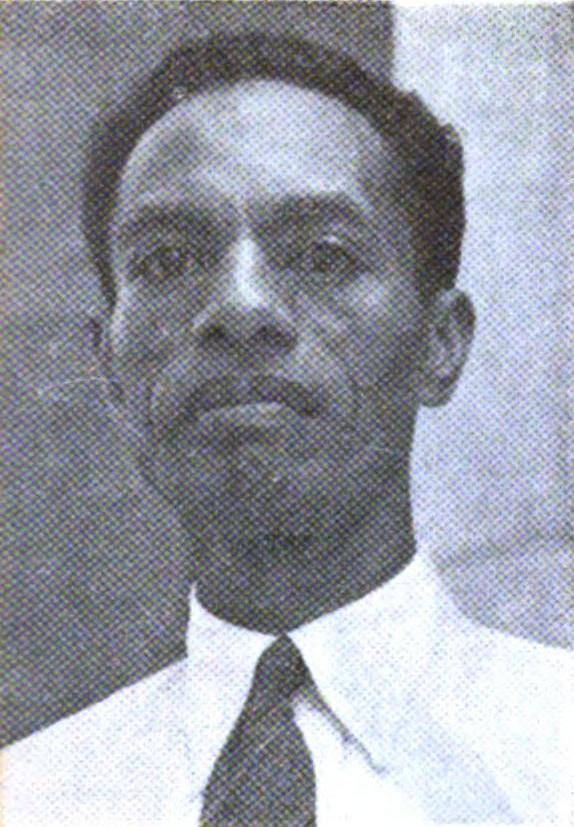
Eliza Urbanus Pupella

Eliza Urbanus Pupella, or E.U. Pupella (older spelling: Poepella) was an Indonesian journalist and nationalist leader from the island of Ambon during the Japanese occupation of the Dutch East Indies that preceded the Indonesian National Revolution and the country's independence. A Christian, Pupella led the nationalist Ambonese League since 1938. During the Japanese occupation, he was appointed as head of the new administration on the island due to the internment of Dutch personnel for the duration of the war.

During the formation of the State of East Indonesia, Pupella was appointed as representative of South Moluccas. Later, he would lead the Populist faction in the Provisional Representative Body. After the resignation of Diapari cabinet on 25 April 1950, Pupella was appointed prime minister-designate by president Soekawati, tasked with forming a new government. However, he did not succeed in forming one, and thus president Soekawati appointed Martinus Putuhena to form the new government, which he succeeded in, and later sworn in as the sixth and final Prime Minister on 10 May 1950.

Pupella would later serve as a representative in the People's Representative Council in Jakarta (both the Federal and the Provisional one) between 1950 and 1956. He died in Ambon on 16 August 1996.
