= Anak Agung Gde Agung (academician) =

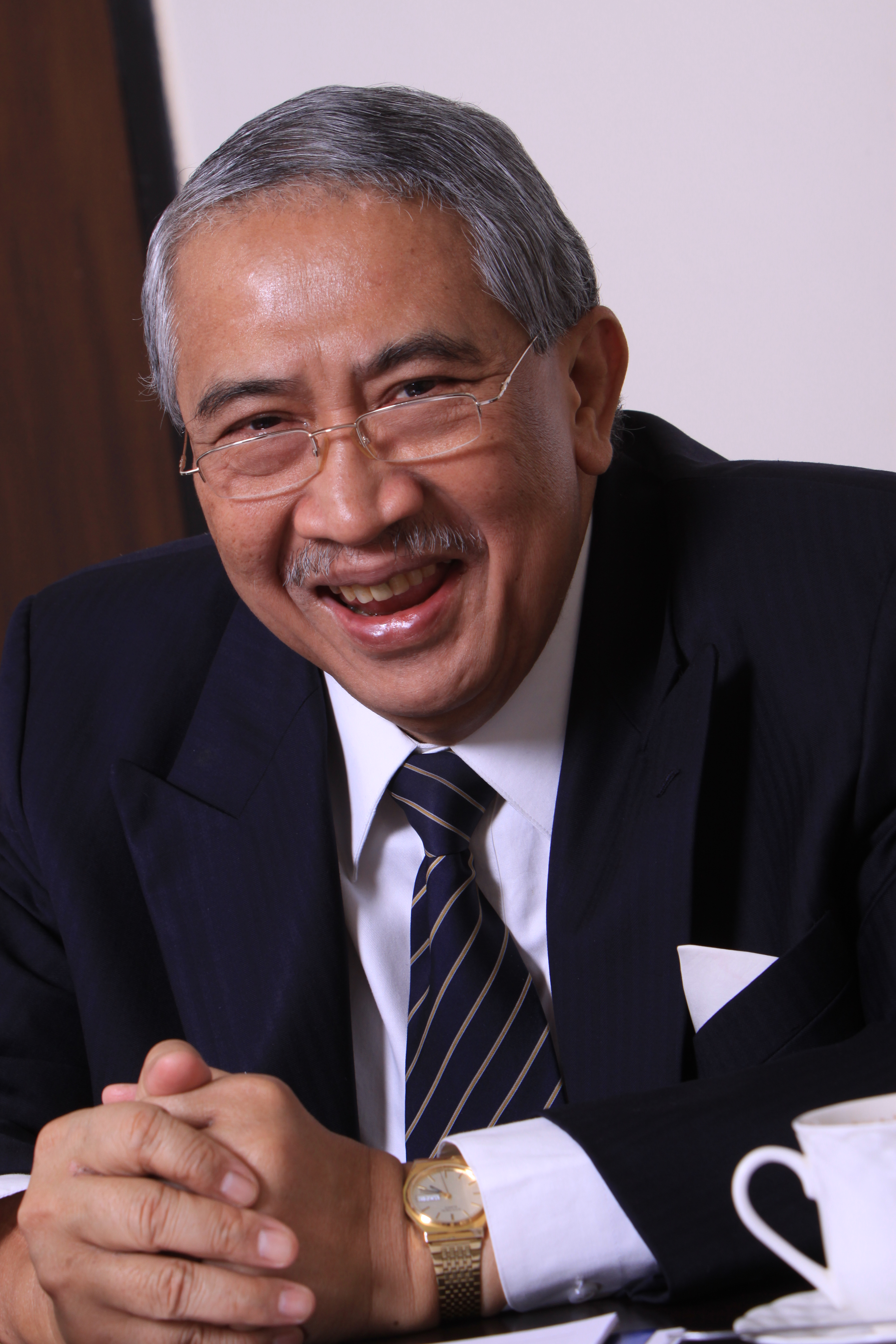

State Minister of Public Issues
- In office 29 October 1999 – 28 August 2000
- President: Abdurrahman Wahid

Head of the National Social Welfare Agency
- In office 29 October 1999 – 28 August 2000
- President: Abdurrahman Wahid

Member of the People's Consultative Assembly
- In office 30 September 1999 – 29 October 1999

CEO, Chief Commissioner and owner of various multinational and domestic corporations
- In office 1975–1999
- In office 2001–now

Personal details
- Born: Gianyar, Bali, Indonesia
- Parent: Ide Anak Agung Gde Agung (father)
- Education: Harvard University (B.A.); Fletcher School of International Law and Diplomacy (M.A.); Leiden University (Ph.D)
- Occupation: Lecturer; businessman; academician

Anak Agung Gde Agung is an Indonesian businessman, statesman, professor and royalty. He is the eldest son of Ide Anak Agung Gde Agung, the Raja of Gianyar (Bali), one of the founding father of modern Indonesia.

Anak Agung received his Bachelor of Arts (Honors) in government studies from Harvard University and then his Master of Arts degree from the Fletcher School of International Law and Diplomacy, Tufts University in Massachusetts, USA. Thereafter he received his doctoral degree (PhD) in social sciences from Leiden University in the Netherlands.

== Career ==
Anak Agung started his professional career in business in Indonesia in domestic and multinational corporations as chief executive officer, chief commissioner and owner. In 1999 he entered politics and became a Member of the People's Consultative Assembly. This was followed by his appointment by President Abdurrahman Wahid on 29 October 1999 as Minister of Public Issues on National Unity Cabinet and as Head of the National Social Welfare Agency. After leaving government service, Anak Agung went on to teaching and received his professorship from the Indonesian government in the field of culture and tourism on which he has written several books.

== Other activities ==
Anak Agung has also been: Chairman of the Board of Trustees of the Indonesia Financial Executive Association (IFEA), Chairman of the Board of Trustees of the Indonesia Heritage Society, Chairman of the Board of Trustees of the Sekar Manggis Foundation, Chairman of the Board of Trustee of the Trisakti University Foundation and Member of the Board of the Trustees of the PPM (Management Education and Development) Foundation, Member of the Board of Advisors of the United States - Indonesia Society (USINDO).

== Books published ==
- Anak Agung Gde Agung (2006). Bali Endangered Paradise ?. Jakarta: Yayasan Sekar Manggis.
- Anak Agung Gde Agung (February 2010). Bali,Contrasting Effects of Globalization. Singapore: Humanities Press. ISBN 978-981-08-5244-3.
- Anak Agung Gde Agung (April 2010). Biocultural Conservation In the Face of Globalization. Jakarta: Yayasan Sekar Manggis. ISBN 978-979-16-3112-9.
- Anak Agung Gde Agung (November 2009). Tri Hita Karana - The Balinese Philosophy of Life. Jakarta: Yayasan Sekar Manggis. ISBN 978-979-16-3111-2.
- Anak Agung Gde Agung (February 2012). The Island of Bali - A Primer. Jakarta: Yayasan Sekar Manggis. ISBN 978-979-16311-3-6.
- Anak Agung Gde Agung (March 2011). Bali Transformation in a Symbol-Oriented Society. Jakarta: Media Bangsa Publisher. ISBN 978-602-77-5703-5.
