= Wet infrastructure =

Type of water management

Wet infrastructure is the spectrum of water-related projects relating to water supply, treatment and storage, water resource management, flood management, coastal restoration, hydropower and renewable energy facilities. Common examples of wet infrastructure include new construction as well as renovations and maintenance of locks, weirs, storm-surge barriers, guiding structures, pumping plants, culverts, bridges, controlling systems, operating systems, and tunnel installations.
