= Martinus Putuhena =

Indonesian politician and engineer (1901–1982)

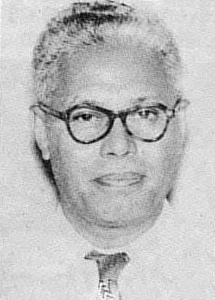
- Portrait, c. date unknown

Prime Minister of East Indonesia
- In office 10 May 1950 – 16 August 1950
- President: Tjokorda Gde Raka Soekawati
- Preceded by: Patuan Doli Diapari
- Succeeded by: Office abolished

Minister of Public Works
- In office 14 November 1945 – 3 July 1947
- Prime Minister: Sutan Sjahrir
- Preceded by: Abikusno Tjokrosujoso
- Succeeded by: Mohammad Enoch

Personal details
- Born: 27 May 1901 Saparua, Amboina, Dutch East Indies (now Indonesia)
- Died: 20 September 1982 (aged 81) Jakarta, Indonesia
- Party: Parkindo
- Spouse: Leen Wattimena
- Children: 6

Martinus Putuhena (27 May 1901 – 20 September 1982) was an Indonesian civil engineer and politician. He was the Minister of Public Works between 1945 and 1947 under Sutan Sjahrir during the Indonesian National Revolution, and in 1950 briefly served as the prime minister of the State of East Indonesia (NIT) prior to its dissolution.

Originating from Saparua, Putuhena was educated at the Technische Hoge School in Bandung before working as an engineer for the colonial government. He was appointed public works minister during the Indonesian National Revolution and then served in the government of the NIT. In NIT, he was initially head of a commission overseeing takeover of NIT security forces, before the political situation resulted in a complete government takeover which he supervised. He continued to work under the Indonesian government's ministry of public works, before entering the private sector as a consultant.

== Early life and education ==
Martinus Putuhena was born on 27 May 1901 in the village of Ihamahu, on the island of Saparua in modern Maluku. He was the third of five children. His family was a relatively affluent fishing family, and his father Petrus Putuhena also cultivated cloves in addition to operating a fishing boat. As a child, he began studying at a local village school, before learning Dutch and enrolling at the main school of Saparua. He then moved to Tondano to continue his education under a scholarship, and then to Yogyakarta where he enrolled at an Algemene Middelbare School (AMS). He graduated from the AMS in 1923.

Putuhena continued his studies at the Technische Hoge School (THS) in Bandung. He had initially wanted to continue his studies at the Netherlands, but the Ambonsch Studiefonds, his sponsor organization that also funded the studies of other future Ambonese leaders, lacked needed funds. At THS, he studied wet civil engineering. During this period, Putuhena became friends with Sukarno who was one year his senior at THS, and he joined Sukarno's Algemeene Studieclub. He graduated as an engineer in 1927.

== Career ==
=== Public works ===
After graduating, Putuhena began to work at the Public Works Department of the colonial government, supervising the construction of the Bandung Post Office as his first assignment. He was reassigned several times—to Batavia, Cirebon and Purwakarta before being posted in Lombok on the eve of the Second World War. At Lombok, he was appointed head of the local public works office, and supervised the construction of the Port of Ampenan. Following the Japanese invasion of the Dutch East Indies, Putuhena was tasked with destroying food supplies and infrastructure in Lombok in a scorched earth move. However, a number of local leaders spoke to Putuhena to refrain from conducting the action, and the extent of the damage was limited to a small number of motor vehicles and a single bridge. He initially retained his job during the Japanese occupation, but after he began to skip work in protest of Japanese brutality, he was investigated and was then incarcerated in Bali for seven months. After his release, he was reassigned to Jakarta.

Following the proclamation of Indonesian independence, Putuhena was appointed as minister of public works in the cabinets of Sutan Sjahrir, joining the first cabinet on 14 November 1945. Putuhena also became a member of the Indonesian Christian Party, and the Central Indonesian National Committee representing Maluku. Along with other Moluccan leaders Putuhena cofounded the Partai Politik Maloekoe in May 1946 to preserve the envisioned unitary nature of the Indonesian state in the aftermath of the Linggadjati Agreement. After Sjahrir's third cabinet collapsed on 3 July 1947, Putuhena was replaced as minister of public works by Mohammad Enoch. Putuhena was retained as a civil servant while also lecturing at Gadjah Mada University.

=== East Indonesia ===
By late 1949, with the revolution coming to a close, a question arose regarding security forces in the State of East Indonesia (NIT). While the central government in Yogyakarta intended to take over, the NIT government refused the appointment of an Indonesian National Armed Forces officer as head of the takeover commission and wanted a KNIL one instead. Putuhena was appointed as a compromise, as while he was firmly in the Republican camp, his Moluccan origin made him an acceptable candidate for the NIT politicians. He established the commission in Makassar in January 1950, and while his work calmed down tensions between the Indonesian Armed Forces (TNI_ and the Dutch colonial forces (KNIL), the APRA coup in January 1950 altered the political situation as the central government began to crack down on the regional governments. The Makassar uprising led by Andi Aziz followed in April, which after its suppression resulted in increased calls for NIT's dissolution.

Putuhena was eventually appointed as Prime Minister of East Indonesia on 10 May 1950, his cabinet being known as the "Liquidation Cabinet" as he was tasked with preparing for the dissolution of the state and its incorporation into unitary Indonesia. He formally dissolved the NIT government in Makassar on 16 August 1950, and returned to Jakarta. Aside from this, Putuhena had also joined a delegation led by Minister of Health Johannes Leimena to negotiate with the breakaway Republic of South Maluku (RMS); however, the delegation was rejected by the separatists and had to return without having talks with RMS leaders.

== Later life and career ==
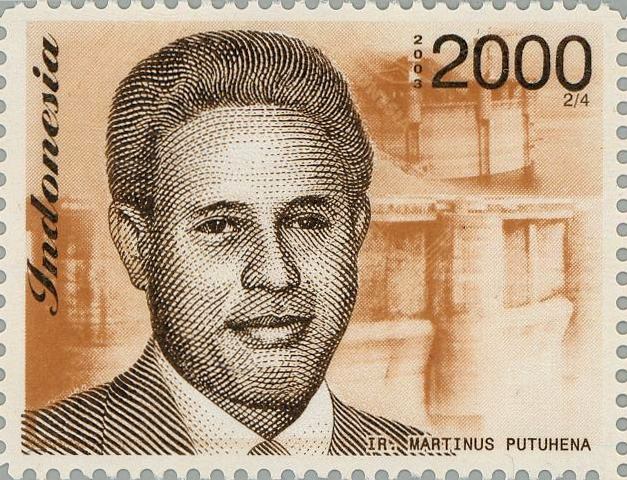
A 2003 stamp featuring Putuhena

Following his return from East Indonesia, Putuhena was appointed as secretary general of the ministry of public works, a position in which he remained until 1956. In this capacity, Putuhena established an academy of public works and arranged for Indonesian engineers to be trained abroad. He rejected an offer to be Ambassador to Burma after he retired, and was placed in the board of Billiton Indonesia, negotiating the company's takeover by the Indonesian government to form PT Timah.

After his retirement from Billiton, Putuhena began working in the private sector, starting a consulting firm to advise on the construction of an Indonesian Atomic Energy Agency facility. The project was halted in 1965 due to the 30 September movement, causing Putuhena's firm to go bankrupt and forcing him to sell his house to move to a smaller one in Tebet, then within the city outskirts. His finances recovered in the 1970s as he formed another consulting firm and began winning projects from the government. He received the Star of Mahaputera, 3rd Class from president Suharto on 13 August 1976. He had by then moved to another small house in Pasar Minggu, which was demolished by a road expansion in 1976.

Putuhena died on 20 September 1982, at the Gatot Soebroto Army Hospital in Jakarta. He had been suffering from complications of hypertension and diabetes for several years. By then, he had fallen into obscurity, with his former colleagues and family only finding out about his condition from a newspaper article in late August 1982. He was buried at the Kalibata Heroes' Cemetery. He had seven children with Leen Wattimena.
