= Semuel Jusof Warouw =

Indonesian physician and politician (1900–1983)

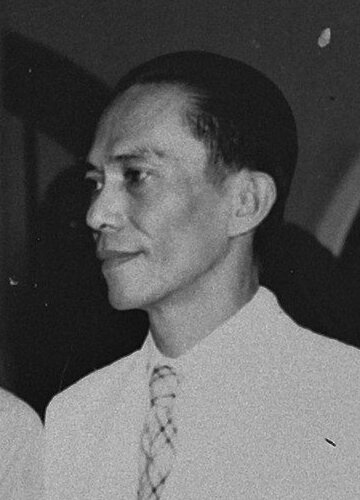
- Warouw in 1947

Prime Minister of East Indonesia
- In office 11 October 1947 – 15 December 1947
- President: Tjokorda Gde Raka Soekawati
- Preceded by: Nadjamuddin Daeng Malewa
- Succeeded by: Ide Anak Agung Gde Agung

Minister of Health
- In office 13 January 1947 – 12 January 1949
- Preceded by: Office established
- Succeeded by: Jan Willem Grootings

Personal details
- Born: c. 1900
- Died: 22 October 1983 (aged 82-83)

Semuel Jusof Warouw (abbreviated as S. J. Warouw; c. 1900 – 22 October 1983) was an Indonesian physician and politician who served as prime minister of the State of East Indonesia (NIT) for two months, from October to December 1947. Warouw also served as minister of health from 1947 to 1949, during the premierships of Nadjamuddin Daeng Malewa, himself, and Ide Anak Agung Gde Agung.

== Early life ==
Born in 1900, he was of Minahasan descent. Warouw was educated at the Batavia Medical College (STOVIA), where he chaired an association of Minahasan students. He was an ophthalmologist by training, and also worked as a civil servant. In the 1930s, he had been elected to the city council of Manado. He advocated for a federal Indonesian state with strong Dutch ties, publishing a manifesto in 1946.

== Political career ==
When the State of East Indonesia (NIT) was established in December 1946, Warouw was working at the health bureau of Manado as a physician, and he was appointed Minister of Health in the cabinets of Nadjamuddin Daeng Malewa. During Nadjamuddin's trip to New York City in mid-1947, he was appointed acting prime minister. The Nadjamuddin cabinet collapsed due to a corruption scandal in late September, and Warouw was appointed as the next formateur on 8 October 1947. While he managed to form a cabinet by 11 October (in which he continued to hold the office of Minister of Health), Warouw was politically unaffiliated and had little political experience.

Warouw had openly supported the continuation of Dutch sovereignty over Indonesia, in direct opposition to a significant faction within the NIT's legislature, and he supported Dutch military actions against the Indonesian Republicans. This was exacerbated by him being a Christian, which made Islamist groups and representatives from South Sulawesi distrust him. In governing, he also tended to bypass parliamentary ratification, which did not sit well with legislators. By 9 December, a motion of faith in the government had been defeated, resulting in Warouw resigning as Prime Minister. Warouw would remain Minister of Health in the succeeding cabinet of Ide Anak Agung Gde Agung, until his replacement on 12 January 1949. During Dutch-Indonesian negotiations in 1949, he promoted Minahasan independence to gain political leverage, but this did not amount to much, and he returned to medicine after the transfer of sovereignty.

Starting in 1956, he joined Hasanuddin University's faculty of medicine, his focus being on eye diseases and neurology. He later also headed Sulawesi's ophthalmological hospital. He was appointed the first president of the Christian University of Indonesia - Tomohon in 1964.

He died on 22 October 1983.
