= Ide Anak Agung Gde Agung =

Indonesian politician, diplomat, and historian (1921–1999)

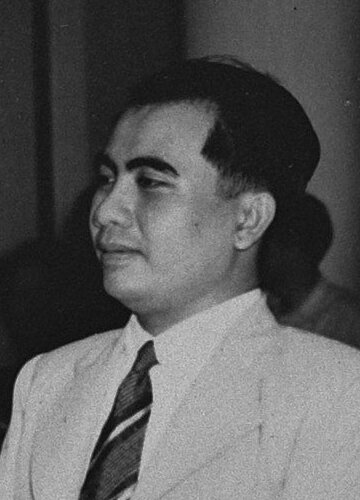
- Anak Agung in 1947

Prime Minister of East Indonesia
- In office 15 December 1947 – 27 December 1949
- President: Tjokorda Gde Raka Soekawati
- Preceded by: Semuel Jusof Warouw
- Succeeded by: Jan Engelbert Tatengkeng

Deputy Prime Minister of East Indonesia
- In office 31 May 1947 – 15 December 1947
- President: Tjokorda Gde Raka Soekawati
- Preceded by: None, position established
- Succeeded by: None, position abolished
Ministerial offices
Minister of Foreign Affairs
In office 12 August 1955 – 24 March 1956
Preceded by	Soenario
Succeeded by	Ruslan Abdulgani
Minister of Home Affairs
In office 20 December 1949 – 6 September 1950
Preceded by	Wongsonegoro
Succeeded by	Assaat
Minister of the Interior of East Indonesia
In office 13 January 1947 – 27 December 1949
Preceded by	Office established
Succeeded by	Muhammad Jabir of Ternate
Diplomatic offices
Indonesian Ambassador to Austria
In office 1970–1977
Preceded by	Laili Roesad
Succeeded by	Abdullah Kamil
Indonesian Ambassador to France
In office 1953–1955
Preceded by	Mohamed Nazir Datoek Pamontjak
Succeeded by	Susanto Tirtoprodjo
Indonesian Ambassador to Belgium
In office 1949–1953
Preceded by	Office established
Succeeded by	Mohamad Razif

Personal details
- Born: 21 July 1921 Gianyar, Bali and Lombok Residency, Dutch East Indies (present-day Indonesia)
- Died: 22 April 1999 (aged 77) Gianyar, Bali, Indonesia
- Party: Democratic Fraction (c. 1950s)
- Children: Anak Agung Gde Agung
- Parent: Ide Anak Agung Ngurah Agung (father)

Ide Anak Agung Gde Agung (Note: EVO: Ide Anak Agoeng Gde Agoeng) (21 July 1921 – 22 April 1999), was an Indonesian politician, diplomat, and historian who was the Raja of Gianyar, Bali. During his political career, he served as prime minister of the State of East Indonesia (1947–1949), minister of home affairs (1949–1950), and minister of foreign affairs (1955–1956). He also served as an ambassador to various Western countries.

Born in Gianyar, Bali, on 21 July 1921, Ide Anak Agung Gde Agung was born to Raja Anak Gunung Ngurah Agung, the Raja of Gianyar. He obtained a doctorate at the University of Utrecht, the Netherlands, in the field of history. He served as the prime minister of the State of East Indonesia from 1947 to 1949. Following the independence of Indonesia, he served as Minister of Home Affairs and Minister of Foreign Affairs during the era of President Sukarno's administration. In addition, he has also served as the Indonesian Ambassador to Belgium, Portugal, France, and Austria.

Based on Presidential Decree No. 066/TK/2007, President Susilo Bambang Yudhoyono bestowed the title of National Hero to several national figures including Ida Anak Agung Gde Agung for his services in the struggle for Indonesian Independence, specifically for establishing and being the main driver of the Federal Consultative Assembly (PMF) in 1948, the association of federal states and territories in Indonesia aimed at gathering political power to overcome various Dutch-Indonesian negotiations.

== Biography ==
=== Early life and education ===
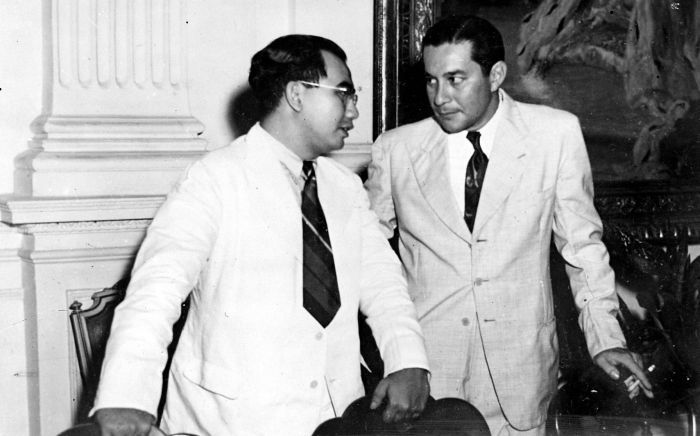
Anak Agung speaking to Sultan Hamid II of Pontianak

Ide Anak Agung Gde Agung was born in Gianyar, Bali, on 21 July 1921. He was the son of Raja Anak Gunung Ngurah Agung, the Raja of Gianyar. Since he was a small child, he was interested in history. He started his school education at the Hollandsche-Inlandsche School, the equivalent of elementary school. He then continued his education at Meer Uitgebreid Lagere Onderwijs (MULO), the equivalent of junior high school. After graduating from MULO, he continued his education at the Algemeene Middelbare School, the equivalent of high school. After that, he studied law at the Rechtshogeschool (The predecessor of the law faculty of the University of Indonesia), in Batavia (now Jakarta), and obtained a Doctorate of History in the Netherlands.

On 23 August 1943, a year after the Japanese invaded, Anak Agung became the Raja of Gianyar, a month after he celebrated his twenty-second birthday, making him only 22 years old. This was after his father was suspected and detained by the Japanese Ministry for treason.

=== Political career ===
Anak Agung's role in politics began in the State of East Indonesia (NIT). He served as prime minister from December 1947 until December 1949. He also served as the premier for Tjokorda Gde Raka Soekawati, a key figure in the East Indonesian government based in Sulawesi. In this role, he played a decisive part in the Round Table Conference that finally led to Dutch recognition of Indonesia's independence.

Following the transfer of sovereignty on 27 December 1949, Agung served as a member of the short-lived Republic of the United States of Indonesia Cabinet, where he served as minister of the interior. Due to his Federalist sympathies, he politically feuded with Sukarno, who advocated a unitary Republic of Indonesia. Following the abolition of the federal system in 1950, he served as the Indonesian ambassador to Belgium, followed by successive appointments as ambassador to Luxembourg, Portugal, France, and Austria. During the Sukarno presidency, Agung served as Indonesia's foreign minister between 1955 and 1956 and was a participant in the West New Guinea dispute. Later, he was imprisoned by the Sukarno regime between 1962 and 1966 but was never brought to trial.

Following the 1965 attempted coup and rise of Suharto's New Order regime, Ide Anak Agung Gde Agung was released by the new Indonesian foreign minister Adam Malik, who also restored him to his senior position in the Ministry of Foreign Affairs. During the New Order era, Agung served as Indonesia's ambassador to Austria. During his time overseas, Agung also authored Twenty Years Indonesian foreign policy 1945–1965, a 660-page history of Indonesian foreign policy during the Sukarno era. In his book, Ide Anak Agung Gde Agung argued that Indonesian foreign policy was based on the principles of independence and action, which meant remaining independent of foreign powers. Agung also argued that Sukarno abandoned Indonesia's independent foreign policy by aligning Indonesia with China and embarking on a policy of confrontation against Malaysia.

=== Death and legacy ===
Ida Anak Agung Gde Agung died in Gianyar, Bali, indonesia, on 22 April 1999. Based on Presidential Decree No. 066/TK/2007, President Susilo Bambang Yudhoyono bestowed the title of National Hero to several national figures, including Ida Anak Agung Gde Agung for his services in the struggle for Indonesian Independence, specifically for his services in 1948 in establishing and being the main driver of the Federal Consultative Assembly (PMF), the association of federal states and territories in Indonesia aimed at gathering political power to overcome various Dutch-Indonesian negotiations. He was also given the Bintang Mahaputra Adipradana award by the Indonesian government. A street in Mega Kuningan business district in Jakarta is named after him.

== Writings ==
=== List of writings ===
The following is a list of writings by Anak Agung.

List of writings
Title	Year of Publication	Publisher	Pages
Dua Puluh Tahun Politik Luar Negeri Indonesia 1945-1965 Twenty Years Indonesian Foreign Policy 1945-1965	1973	Mouton	640
Kenangan masa lampau zaman kolonial Hindia Belanda dan zaman pendudukan Jepang di Bali Memories of the past during the Dutch East Indies colonial era and the Japanese occupation in Bali	1993	Obor Indonesia	236
Persetujuan Linggajati prolog & epilog Linggajati agreement prologue & epilogue	1995	Pustaka Nusatama	444
Renville – Terjemahan Renville – Translation	1991	Sinar Harapan	407
Pernyataan Rum-van Roijen Rum-van Roijen statement	1995	University of Michigan	124
Dari Terbentuknya Negara Indonesia Timur Menuju Berdirinya Negara Indonesia Serikat From the Formation of the State of East Indonesia Towards the Establishment of the United States of Indonesia	1996	Obor Indonesia	906
