= State of East Indonesia =

1946–1950 state of the Dutch East Indies then Indonesia

State of the Great East (24–27 December 1946) Negara Timur Raya State of East Indonesia (27 December 1946 – 17 August 1950) Negara Indonesia Timur Oost-Indonesië
- 1946–1950
- Flag Coat of Arms

- Status: Dutch puppet state (1946–1948); Constituent state of the United States of Indonesia (1949–1950)
- Capital: Makassar
- Common languages: Indonesian • Eastern Indonesia Malay • Dutch • Various indigenous languages
- Religion: Islam; Christianity; Hinduism
- Demonym: East Indonesian
- Government: Parliamentary republic
- President
  - 1946–1950: Tjokorda Gdé Raka Soekawati
- Prime Minister
  - 1946: Nadjamuddin Daeng Malewa (first)
  - 1950: Martinus Putuhena (last)
- Legislature
  - Upper house: Provisional Senate
  - Lower house: Provisional Representative Body
- Historical era: Aftermath of World War II; Indonesian National Revolution
  - Denpasar Conference: 24 December 1946
  - Part of the United States of Indonesia: 27 December 1949
  - Makassar Uprising: 5–21 April 1950
  - Joined Indonesia: 17 August 1950

Area
- 1946: 349,088 km^{2} (134,784 sq mi)

Population
  - 1946: 10,290,000
Preceded by	Succeeded by
Great East	Republic of Indonesia; Republic of South Maluku
- Today part of: Indonesia

The State of East Indonesia (Indonesian: Negara Indonesia Timur, old spelling: Negara Indonesia Timoer, Dutch: Oost-Indonesië) was a post–World War II state formed in the eastern half of Dutch East Indies. Established in December 1946 by the Dutch, it was a puppet state formed during the Indonesian National Revolution that eventually became a part of the United States of Indonesia (USI) in 1949 at the end of the conflict and was dissolved in 1950 with the end of the USI. It comprised every island to the east of Borneo (Celebes and the Moluccas, with their offshore islands) and of Java (Bali and the Lesser Sunda Islands).

== History ==
=== Establishment ===
The Dutch authorities, after various changes to the administration of the eastern islands of the East Indies, established the Great East region in 1938. Four years later, the Japanese invaded, and this area was placed under the control of the Imperial Japanese Navy. Following the Japanese surrender and the Indonesian declaration of independence in August 1945, Indonesian republicans began fighting to secure Indonesian independence from Dutch colonial control. However, Dutch administrators backed by Australian troops arrived in the area previously controlled by the Japanese Navy, and prevented republicans from establishing an administration.

From 16 to 25 July 1946, the Dutch organized a conference in the town of Malino on Celebes (Sulawesi) as part of their attempt to arrange a federal solution for Indonesia. The Malino Conference resulted in plans for a state in Borneo and another in eastern Indonesia, areas where the Dutch held both de facto and de jure control. Later that year, the Republic of Indonesia agreed to the principle of a federal Indonesia in the Linggadjati Agreement of 15 November. The Denpasar Conference of 18–24 December was held to work out the details of a state which to be called the State of the Great East (Indonesian: Negara Timoer Besar). That state was established on 24 December and, on 27 December, renamed the State of East Indonesia (Negara Indonesia Timoer or 'NIT'). Also at the conference, Balinese nobleman Tjokorda Gde Raka Soekawati was elected president. Although opponents joked that "NIT" stood for negara ikoet toean or 'state which goes along with the master', i.e. the Dutch, nevertheless, it was recognized by the Republic of Indonesia as a state within the United States of Indonesia on 19 January 1948.

=== Part of the United States of Indonesia ===
With the realization of the United States of Indonesia on 27 December 1949, East Indonesia became a constituent state of the new federation. In much of Indonesia, the federal USI was seen as an illegitimate regime foisted on the islands by the Dutch, and many of the federal states began to merge with the Republic of Indonesia. However many in East Indonesia, with its non-Javanese population and sizable number of Christians, opposed moves toward a unitary state.

At the end of 1949, elections were held for a parliament to replace the previous Provisional Representative Body. This resulted in almost half the seats being won by supporters of a unitary Indonesian state. When President Soekawati tried to form a new cabinet, the unitarists refused to participate unless it was committed to dissolving the state. On 16 March 1950, two days after its formation without any unitarist representation, the new cabinet bowed to pressure and lifted the ban on demonstrations. The following day, there was a huge demonstration in Makassar calling for the dissolution of the NIT into the Republic of Indonesia. As a result, restrictions were reimposed, and Justice Minister Soumokil ordered the arrest of non-parliamentary unitarist supporters.

=== Uprising and independence proposal ===
In the second week of March Soekawati asked cabinet director J.C. van Krieken to prepare an NIT declaration of independence, although van Krieken advised against this. Soekawati and Soumokil, along with former cabinet minister Dolf Metekohy, began to draw up plans to separate the NIT from the USI. Because of rumours of republican troops from the USI army (APRIS) being sent from Jakarta, ex-soldiers of the Dutch colonial army, the KNIL became increasingly concerned about their future within the Java-dominated KNIL.

On 23 April the Jakarta government announced it was sending APRIS troops to the NIT. This was part of the central government's plan to establish military control over the whole of the country. Soekawari held meetings with the soldiers and told them they had his support, but told them that if they wanted to take any action to prevent the landings, it would have to be on their own initiative as he was constitutionally unable to order any action. On 3 April there was a mass meeting of 700 KNIL troops, at which a motion was passed opposing any landings before the KNIL troops had been fully incorporated into APRIS. On the evening of the next day, Soumokil appointed former KNIL lieutenant Andi Aziz to lead any action against the landings.

On 5 April, the day the troops were due to land, in response, Andi Aziz took control of the city, deployed artillery and successfully turned the troopships away. The NIT government refused to support Azis. On 13 April, Soekawati, Prime Minister Jan Engelbert Tatengkeng, Parliament Speaker Hoesain Poeang Limboro, federalist legislators and Azis held a meeting at the presidential palace and discussed breaking away from the RUSI in order to save the NIT. However, it was realised that federalists would not be able to secure the two-thirds majority necessary in parliament for an independence declaration. A declaration by the cabinet alone, backed up by Azi's troops was also considered, as was a coup, again with support from Azis as well as Soumokil and Matekohy, who was particularly keen on the plan, but there was no agreement to proceed. The following day, following a guarantee of his safety from the USI government, Azis travelled to Jakarta, where he was arrested. On 19 March his troops surrendered to the NIT APRIS commander, and the next day, the troops from Jakarta landed unopposed.

It subsequently emerged that the Azis affair had been part of a four-part plan, known as the Metekohy Plan, to secure independence for the NIT. The four stages were:

1. The NIT government would express no support for Azis's actions
2. The government would produce documentary evidence of the USI plan to dissolve the NIT
3. Having garnered local and global support, the NIT government would formally express support for Azis
4. If the RIS government did not back down, the NIT would declare independence

=== Dissolution ===
Following the events in Makassar, the cabinet lost parliamentary support. Following the failure to attract any support for independence, President Soekawati accepted the end of the NIT. On 21 April, he agreed to the NIT being dissolved into the United States of Indonesia if the Republic of Indonesia would do the same. The formation of East Indonesia's last cabinet in May 1950 with the intention implementing this led to open rebellion in the largely Christian Moluccas and the proclamation of an independent Republic of the South Moluccas (RMS). The USI was dissolved on 17 August 1950 and the rebellion in the Moluccas was crushed in November of the same year.

== Government ==
The Denpasar Conference of 18–24 December 1946 approved the Regulations for the Formation of the State of East Indonesia (Peratoeran Pembentoekan Negara Indonesia Timoer) which supplemented the 1927 Dutch colonial law and established the provisional governmental framework of the new state until a constitution could be approved. Although the draft constitution was passed by the legislative on 1 March 1949, it was never adopted and the 1946 regulations remained in place until the state was dissolved. The state was to have an executive president who would appoint a cabinet and a legislature. A number of powers were explicitly reserved for the future United States of Indonesia, of which East Indonesia would be a constituent member.

=== President ===
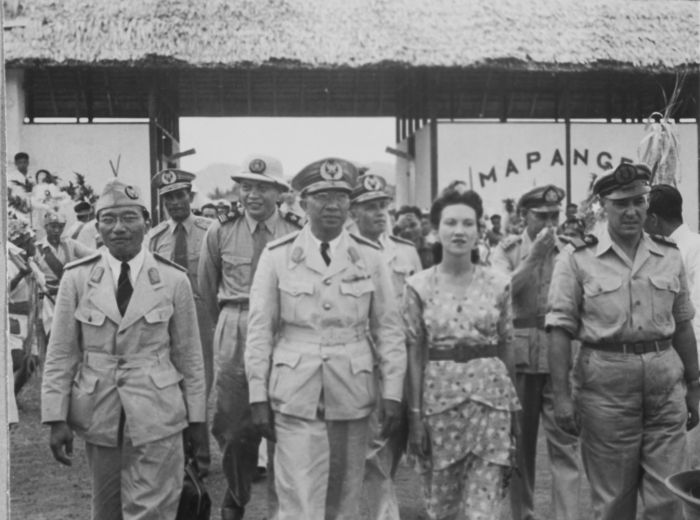
President Tjokorda Gdé Raka Soekawati of the State of East Indonesia and his wife, Gilberte Vincent, during a visit to North Celebes in 1948

Balinese nobleman Tjokorda Gdé Raka Soekawati was elected president at the Denpasar Conference that established the state, and held that position for the duration of the state's existence (24 December 1946 – 17 August 1950).

=== Legislature ===
The Provisional Representative Body for the State of East Indonesia (Dewan Perwakilan Sementara Negara Indonesia Timoer), initially consisting of the 70 participants of the Denpasar Conference, opened its first session on 22 April 1947 in the presence of Lieutenant Governor General of the Dutch East Indies Hubertus van Mook. On 20 February 1950 the Provisional Representative Body of East Indonesia was disbanded after the general election, which had taken place between September and December 1949. It was replaced by the People's Representative Council of East Indonesia. The newly formed People's Representative Council was later disbanded following the dissolution of East Indonesia.

In May 1949, a Provisional Senate was established, tasked initially with deliberating proposed constitution for East Indonesia. The Provisional Senate was later disbanded following the dissolution of East Indonesia, before any promulgation of the proposed constitution.

=== Prime ministers and cabinets ===
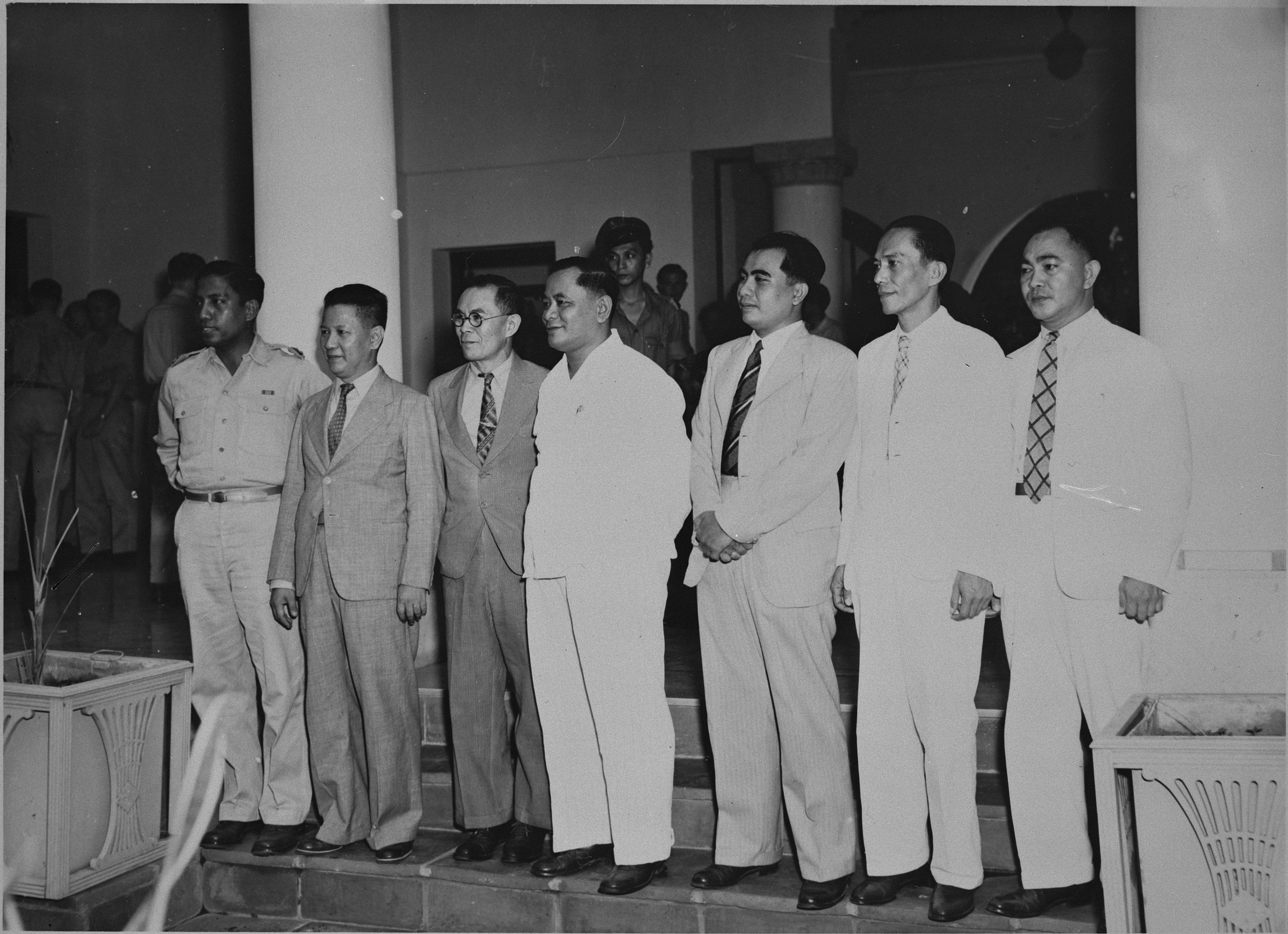
The First Nadjamoedin Daeng Malewa cabinet of East Indonesia, which was installed at 4 o'clock in the afternoon of 13 January 1947 in the former building of the Council of Indies in Batavia.

The state had a parliamentary cabinet led by a prime minister, who was appointed by the president. However, much real power remained with the Dutch East Indies authorities.

== Administrative divisions ==
The State of East Indonesia was initially divided into five residencies of the Great East which were in turn divided into districts (afdeling) and subdistricts (onderafdeling), an administrative structure inherited from the Dutch. Within the residencies were 13 autonomous regions. These regions, listed in Article 14 of the Regulations for the Formation of the State of East Indonesia (Peratoeran Pembentoekan Negara Indonesia Timoer), were South Celebes, Minahasa, Sangihe and Talaud, North Celebes, Central Celebes, Bali, Lombok, Sumbawa, Flores, Sumba, Timor and surrounding islands, South Moluccas, and North Moluccas.

The residencies were to be eliminated after the construction of functioning administration in the 13 regions. Complicating this structure was the fact that:

More than 75% of the State of East Indonesia consisted of autonomous regions, in total 115 autonomous regional governments under the rule of rajas (swaprajas). The position of these autonomous governmental heads was regulated by what were called korte verklaring (short-term declarations) and lange kontrakten (long-term contracts); these were actually intended as a recognition by the Dutch Indies Government of the special position of the rajas, whose power to govern the autonomous regions was handed down from one generation to the next.

The Autonomous Region Regulation of 1938 gave the swaprajas wide de jure autonomy but most of the rajas were puppets of Dutch administrators. The State of East Indonesia sought to curtail the power of these raja-ruled regions, but the Regulations for the Formation of the State of East Indonesia obliged the state to recognise their special status.

The remaining area of the state not part of the swaprajas comprised directly governed regions (rechtstreeks bestuurd gebied). Directly governed areas included Minahasa, the South Moluccas, Gorontalo, the districts of Macassar and Bonthain, and Lombok.

=== Residencies and autonomous regions ===
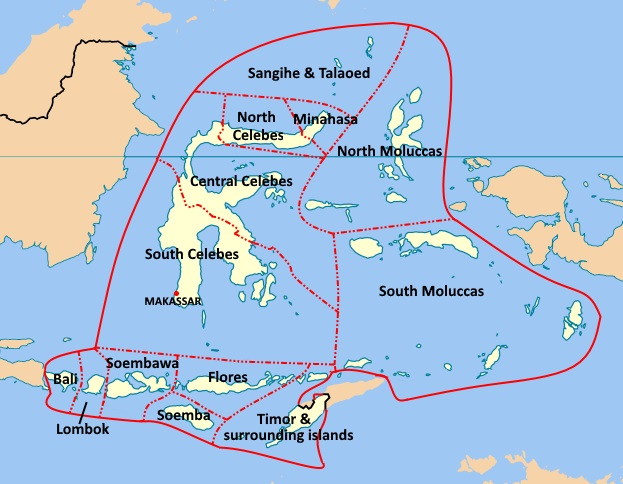
The regions of the State of East Indonesia

The following were the residencies and their autonomous regions.

Residencies under Dutch East Indies	Autonomous regions to be created under East Indonesia
North Celebes (Soelawesi Oetara)	North Celebes
North Celebes (Soelawesi Oetara)	Central Celebes
North Celebes (Soelawesi Oetara)	Minahasa
North Celebes (Soelawesi Oetara)	Sangihe and Talaud
South Celebes (Soelawesi Selatan)	South Celebes
Bali en Lombok	Bali
Bali en Lombok	Lombok
The Moluccas (Maloekoe)	North Moluccas
The Moluccas (Maloekoe)	South Moluccas
Timor	Timor and surroundings
Timor	Flores
Timor	Sumbawa
Timor	Sumba

== Notable people ==
- Tjokorda Gde Raka Soekawati, president
- Nadjamuddin Daeng Malewa, first prime minister
- Semuel Jusof Warouw, second prime minister
- Ide Anak Agung Gde Agung, third prime minister
- Jan Engelbert Tatengkeng, fourth prime minister
- Patuan Doli Diapari, fifth prime minister
- Martinus Putuhena, sixth prime minister
- Sulaiman Binol, social affairs minister and member of NIT legislature
- Eliza Urbanus Pupella, representative of South Moluccas
- Muhammad Kaharuddin III member of the USI Senate
- Tadjuddin Noor chair of the NIT legislature, later member of the Senate
- Melkias Agustinus Pellaupessy, Speaker of Senate
- Arnold Mononutu, member of provisional parliament
- Julius Tahija, representative to United States of Indonesia in Batavia.
- Gabriel Manek, member of provisional parliament

== See also ==
- History of Indonesia
- Indonesian National Revolution
- Indonesian regions
