= Nadjamuddin Daeng Malewa =

Indonesian politician and businessman (1907–1950)

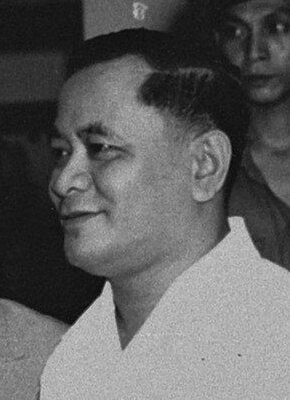
- Nadjamuddin in 1947

Prime Minister of East Indonesia
- In office 13 January 1947 – 17 September 1947
- President: Tjokorda Gde Raka Soekawati
- Preceded by: Office established
- Succeeded by: Semuel Jusof Warouw

Mayor of Makassar
- In office c. May 1945 – 11 September 1945
- Preceded by: B. Yamasaki
- Succeeded by: D. M. van Swietene

Personal details
- Born: c. 1907 Buton, Celebes and Dependencies Residency, Dutch East Indies
- Died: 5 January 1950 (aged 42–43) Makassar, East Indonesia
- Spouse: Siti Khodijah binti Daeng Mudhinun
- Children: 10
- Occupation: Politician; bureaucrat

Nadjamuddin Daeng Malewa (EVO: Nadjamoeddin Daeng Malewa; c. 1907 – 5 January 1950) was an Indonesian politician and businessman who served as the first prime minister of the State of East Indonesia (NIT) from January to September 1947. Prior to his premiership, Nadjamuddin briefly served as the mayor of Makassar in 1945 and was active in the Indonesian nationalist movement.

Born in 1907, on the island of Buton, Nadjamuddin received his education in Makassar. During the 1920s and 1930s, he became active in the nationalist movement. In 1931, he led the foundation of the Indonesian Shipping Association which organized shipowners from Sulawesi. During the Japanese occupation (1942–1945), he was appointed to the position of mayor of Makassar. During the Indonesian National Revolution (1945–1949), and after the Denpasar Conference (which he took part in), Nadjamuddin became the Prime Minister of the State of East Indonesia. His premiership ended following charges of Embezzlement, and he was replaced by Semuel Jusof Warouw. Following the end of his term, he was sentenced to prison and he died while on parole.

== Early life and career ==
Nadjamuddin was born in 1907 in Buton, to Bugis parents Abdul Rahim and Hanah Fatimah. He was born at a Bugis village on the island, where his father served as chief and was relatively prominent and wealthy. He spent his school years in Makassar. Nadjamuddin worked as a trader in Makassar. He joined the Celebes Association (Perserikatan Selebes) in Buton during the late 1920s, and he later became chairman of the organization's Makassar branch. Following internal conflict between the members of the organization from North and South Sulawesi, Nadjamuddin took over the southern part and reorganized it into Celebes Party (Partai Selebes).

The party later joined the Great Indonesia Party (Parindra). In 1931, with the support of nationalist leaders such as Soetomo, Nadjamuddin founded the Indonesian Shipping Association (Rukun Pelayaran Indonesia), whose members consisted of Bugis traders in Surabaya. The organization aimed to organize shipowners from Sulawesi and was initially successful, with branch offices in a number of major cities. However, in August 1938, Nadjamuddin was expelled from Parindra due to accusations of embezzlement, and the association went into decline.

== Political career ==
He briefly served as Mayor of Makassar during the Japanese occupation period, being appointed to the position in May 1945. Shortly before the Surrender of Japan, a delegation from Sulawesi was sent to Jakarta to participate in a meeting of the Preparatory Committee for Indonesian Independence, led by Manadonese Sam Ratulangi and excluding Nadjamuddin. After the return of Dutch forces to Indonesia and the commencement of the Indonesian National Revolution, Nadjamuddin generally collaborated with the Dutch, namely Governor-General Hubertus van Mook on economic issues.

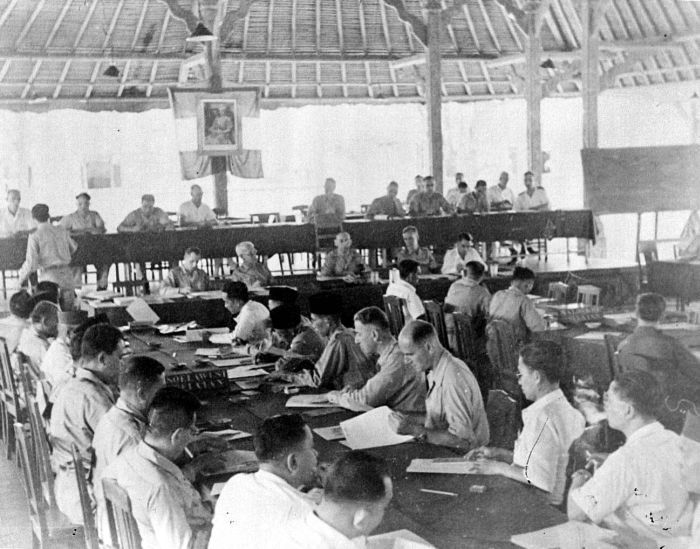
The Denpasar Conference

He met with Sam Ratulangi in a closed-door meeting in late October 1945, after the establishment of the Netherlands Indies Civil Administration (NICA) in Sulawesi, and the following day Nadjamuddin announced his willingness to work with NICA. In November, he was appointed to NICA positions on maritime and trade affairs. Nadjamuddin's collaboration stance resulted in a significant weakening of Ratulangi's pro-republican faction in Sulawesi, as many of Sulawesi's nobility switched sides after Nadjamuddin's announcement. Nadjamuddin met van Mook and other Dutch officials in Jakarta during February 1946, and then became a signatory of the Malino Conference. During the conference, he championed the formation of an independent United States of Indonesia which would form a bilateral relationship with the Netherlands.

Following the conference, he was appointed into a body of seven politicians which would engage with the Dutch government on the formation of government structures in Dutch-held territories. He later took part in the Denpasar Conference, where he cited the Linggadjati Agreement to appeal for the release of political prisoners. After the State of East Indonesia (NIT) was formed, he took part in the election for the head of state, placing third in the first round of elections behind Tjokorda Gde Raka Soekawati and Tadjuddin Noor. Soekawati, elected as head of state, appointed Nadjamuddin as prime minister.

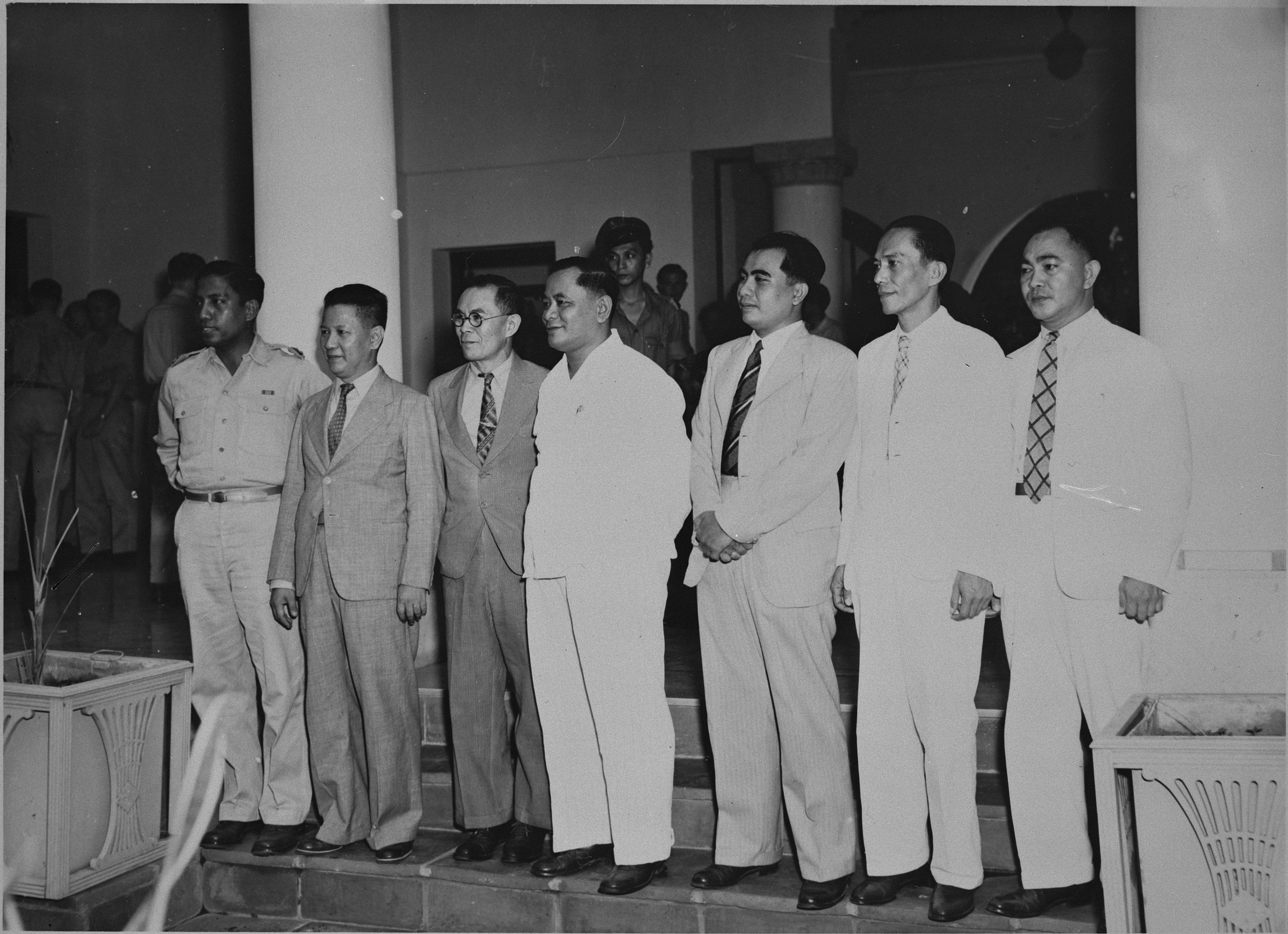
Nadjamuddin's first cabinet

In late December and early January 1947, after the Denpasar Conference, Nadjamuddin and Soekawati worked to form NIT's first cabinet in Jakarta (instead of NIT's capital Makassar, which lacked proper facilities). The cabinet was completed and inaugurated on 13 January 1947. Nadjamuddin's cabinet was designed to include the regions of NIT as ministers, and also included representatives from the Dutch and Chinese groups. He named his cabinet the "Development Cabinet". On 2 June 1947, the cabinet was reshuffled following political pressure from the pro-Republican "Progressive Faction" in the legislature.

As prime minister, Nadjamuddin put effort into improving the shipping industry in East Indonesia. He established an agency in Makassar which provided loans and training to sailors and boat owners, and advised the government on maritime rules and arrangements. Economically, Nadjamuddin aimed to improve shipping facilities to allow exports of commodities from South Sulawesi and improve distribution of agricultural products within NIT. He also arranged for the importation of a large quantity of textiles to meet domestic requirements.

== Death and legacy ==
Following the 1947 Dutch military offensive against the Indonesian Republic (Operation Product), Nadjamuddin announced the NIT's approval of the actions. He departed for New York to attend a meeting of the United Nations Security Council on 11 August 1947, leading the NIT's delegation. During September, accusations were brought up against Nadjamuddin, regarding potential embezzlement of imported textiles.

This led to the dismissal of Nadjamuddin as prime minister (while he was still in the Netherlands) by acting president Muhammad Kaharuddin III (as president Soekawati was also still in the Netherlands) on 17 September 1947. Once Nadjamuddin arrived at Jakarta, he was detained and tried there, and was eventually sentenced to three and a half years in prison. Nadjamuddin died on 5 January 1950 in his Makassar home. He had previously been suffering from a heart condition, and due to his illness, he was released from jail on parole to receive treatment at the Stella Maris Hospital.
