= Jan Engelbert Tatengkeng =

Indonesian poet and former politician

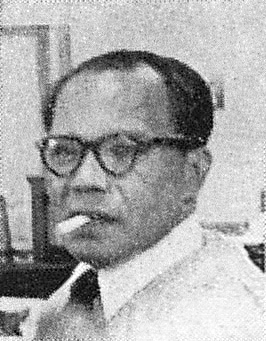
- Tatengkeng, 1954

Prime Minister of East Indonesia
- In office December 27, 1949 – March 14, 1950
- President: Tjokorda Gde Raka Soekawati
- Preceded by: Ide Anak Agung Gde Agung
- Succeeded by: D.P. Diapari

Personal details
- Born: October 19, 1907 Kolongan, Sangihe, North Sulawesi, Dutch East Indies
- Died: March 6, 1968 (aged 60) Makassar, South Sulawesi, Indonesia
- Profession: Poet

Jan Engelbert Tatengkeng (October 19, 1907 – March 6, 1968) was an Indonesian politician and poet who served as the prime minister of the State of East Indonesia (NIT). He was also a poet from the Pujangga Baru era of Indonesian literature.

== Early life ==
Jan Engelbert Tatengkeng was educated at a Hollandsch-Inlandsche School (HIS, Dutch Native School) in Manganitu, a Christelijk Middagkweekscool (Christian Normal School) in Bandung and a Christian teachers' college in Surakarta, Central Java, where he learned about Tachtigers, a form of Dutch literature that later influenced most of his work.

== List of works ==
Most of Tatengkeng's works were influenced by Tachtigers and Christianity. His best known collection of poems is Rindu Dendam (Longing For Revenge), which contains 32 poems and was first published in 1934. He also published poems in magazines.

His other works comprise works of prose and a play.

=== Works ===
Poems first published in the magazine Poedjangga Baroe

- Hasrat Hati (Heart's Desire)
- Anak Kecil (Little Children)
- Laut (The Sea)
- Beethoven
- Petang (Evening)
- Alice Nahon
- O, Bintan (O, Stars)
- Gambaran (Overview)
- Sinar dan Bayang (Lights and Shadows)
- Katamu Tuhan (God's Words)
- Sinar di Balik (Behind the Light)
- Willem Kloos
- Tangis (Cry)

Poems first published in other magazines

- Anak Kecil (Little Children)
- Penumpang kelas 1 (First Class Passenger) (also known as "Traveller First Class")
- Gadis Bali (Balinese Girl)
- Aku Berjasa (I am Honoured)
- Gua Gaja (Cave of Elephant)
- Cintaku (My Love)
- Ke Balai (To The Hall)
- Mengheningkan Cipta (Moment of Silence)
- Sekarang Ini (It Is Now)
- Aku dan Temanku (Me and My Friend)
- Sinar dan Bayang (Lights and Shadows)
- Kepada Dewan Pertimbangan Kebudayaan (To the Council of Cultural Considerations)
- Aku Dilukis (I'm Being Painted)
- Sang Pemimpin (Waktu) Keci (The Childhood Leader)
- Bertemu Setan (Meeting Satan)

Prose Works

- Datuk yang Ketularan (The Infected Datuk)
- Kemeja Pancawarna (Five-colored Shirt)
- Prawira Pers Tukang Nyanyi (The Journalist Singer)
- Saya Masuk Sekolah Belanda (I Entered a Dutch School)
- Sepuluh Hari Aku Tak Mandi (I Didn't Take a Shower For Ten Days)

Drama

- Lena (1958)
