= President of the State of East Indonesia =

Head of state of the State of East Indonesia (1946–1950)

- Presiden Negara Indonesia Timur (Indonesian)
- Pennant of the president

- Flag of the president

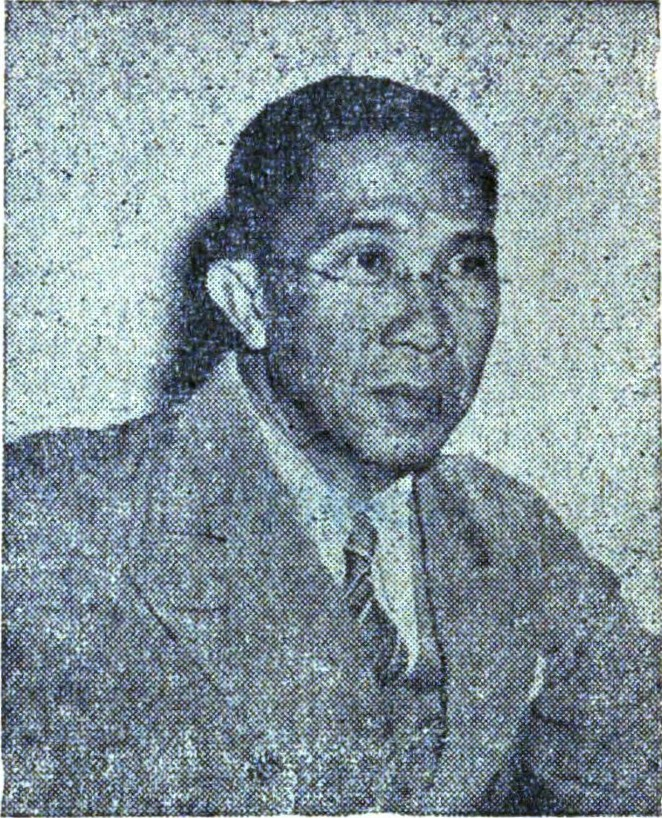
- Only officeholder Tjokorda Gde Raka Soekawati; 24 December 1946 – 16 August 1950
- Status: Head of state
- Formation: 24 December 1946
- Abolished: 16 August 1950

The president of the State of East Indonesia (Indonesian: Presiden Negara Indonesia Timur) was the head of state of the State of East Indonesia (NIT) from 1946 until 1950, when the NIT was dissolved into the Republic of Indonesia. Balinese nobleman and politician Tjokorda Gde Raka Soekawati was the first and only person to have served as president, though the speaker of the Provisional Representative Body would take over as acting president when Soekawati went on overseas trips.

== History ==
=== Background ===
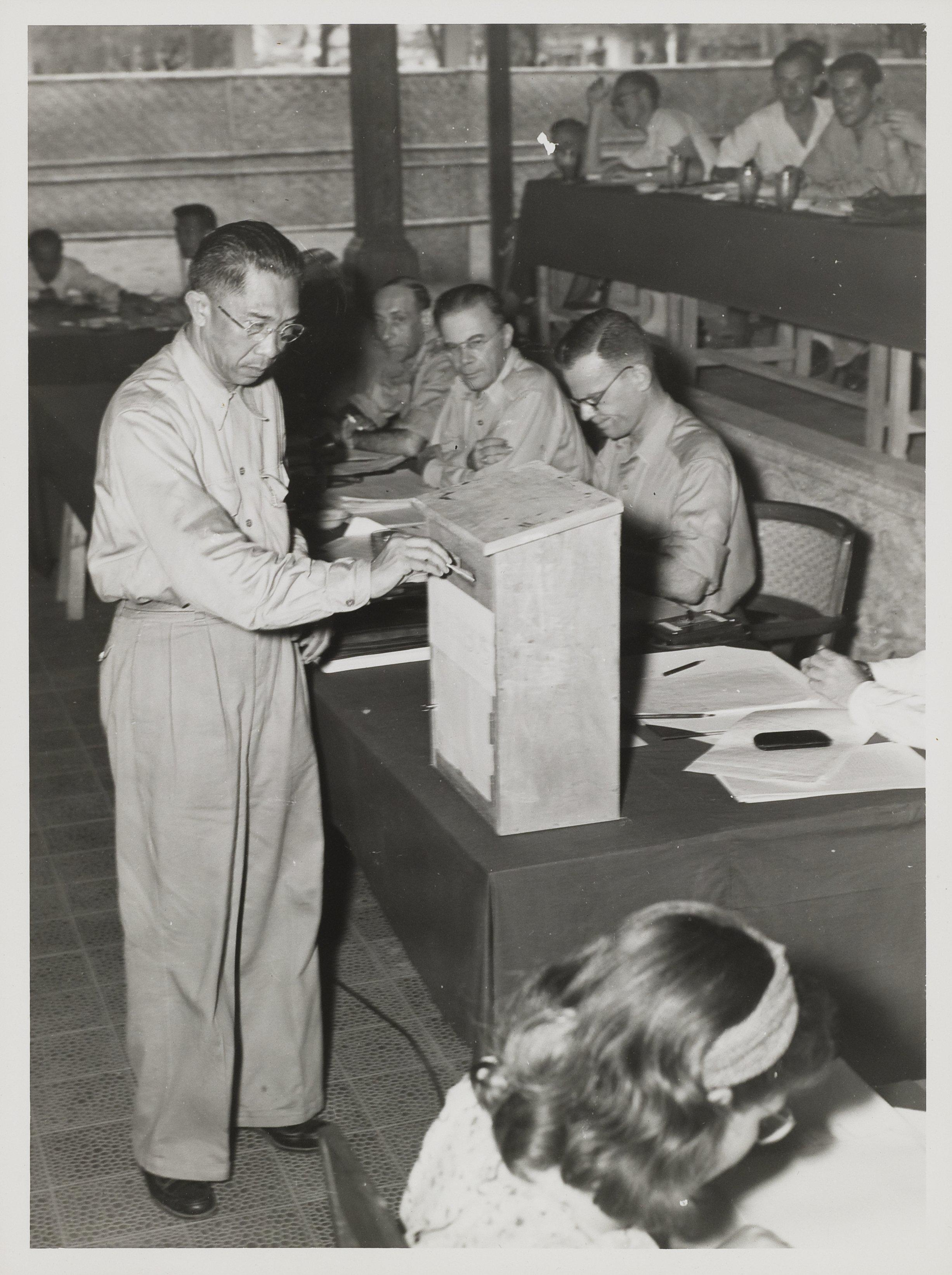
Tjokorda Gde Raka Soekawati casting his vote in the NIT presidential election held during the Denpasar Conference

Following the end of World War II, Indonesian nationalists proclaimed the country's independence on 17 August 1945, beginning the Indonesian National Revolution as they fought the returning Dutch who were reluctant to recognize the new Republic of Indonesia. In Eastern Indonesia, however, the Dutch faced minimal resistance as the Republican government based in Java had "no power, no army and no weapons in this part of Indonesia" to fight the Dutch effectively.

Lieutenant Governor-General Hubertus van Mook then sought to create autonomous regions and puppet states in Indonesia as part of a federal state in order to restore Dutch power and reshape the political landscape against the Republic. Van Mook subsequently organized the Malino Conference held from 16–25 July 1946, wherein the Dutch hosted local rulers from the outer islands to plan the formation of 16 new federal states.

Several months later, the Linggadjati Agreement occurred, resulting in Dutch recognition of de facto Republican authority in Java, Madura, and Sumatra. The agreement also led to an opportunity for the creation of a federal state in the Groote Oost (lit. 'Great East') governorate. Thereafter, the Dutch organized the Denpasar Conference held from 7–24 December 1946 with the aim of creating a new government administration for the Great East. The end result was the establishment of the State of East Indonesia (Negara Indonesia Timur, NIT) with a president and a prime minister.

=== Presidential election ===
Candidate	1st vote		2nd vote		3rd vote	
Candidate	Votes	%	Votes	%	Votes	%
Tjokorda Gde Raka Soekawati	31	45.59	31	45.59	36	52.94
Tadjuddin Noor	24	35.29	31	45.59	32	47.06
Nadjamuddin Daeng Malewa	13	19.12	6	8.82	—N/a	
Total	68	100.00	68	100.00	68	100.00

One of the agendas of the Denpasar Conference was the election of the president, with candidates being nominated by at least 10 members of the Conference. A two-thirds majority of valid votes was needed to elect the president, though a re-vote would be held if no candidate reached the threshold. If a two-thirds majority wasn't reached in the re-vote as well, then a third vote would be held with only a simple majority needed. If no candidate won a simple majority, then the president would be decided via a lottery. Three candidates were nominated, namely Tjokorda Gde Raka Soekawati of Bali, Tadjuddin Noor of South Sulawesi, and Nadjamuddin Daeng Malewa also of South Sulawesi.

In the first round of voting, 68 ballots were cast according to the election committee. Soekawati came in first place with 31 votes, followed by Tadjuddin Noor and Nadjamuddin, who won 24 and 13 votes, respectively. As no candidate won a two-thirds majority, a re-vote was held which saw a tie between Soekawati and Tadjuddin Noor, both of whom had received 31 votes. Meanwhile, Nadjamuddin won 6 votes. As a two-thirds majority wasn't reached again, another vote was held between only Soekawati and Tadjuddin Noor, resulting in the election of the former as president by a vote of 36–32.

== Oath of office ==
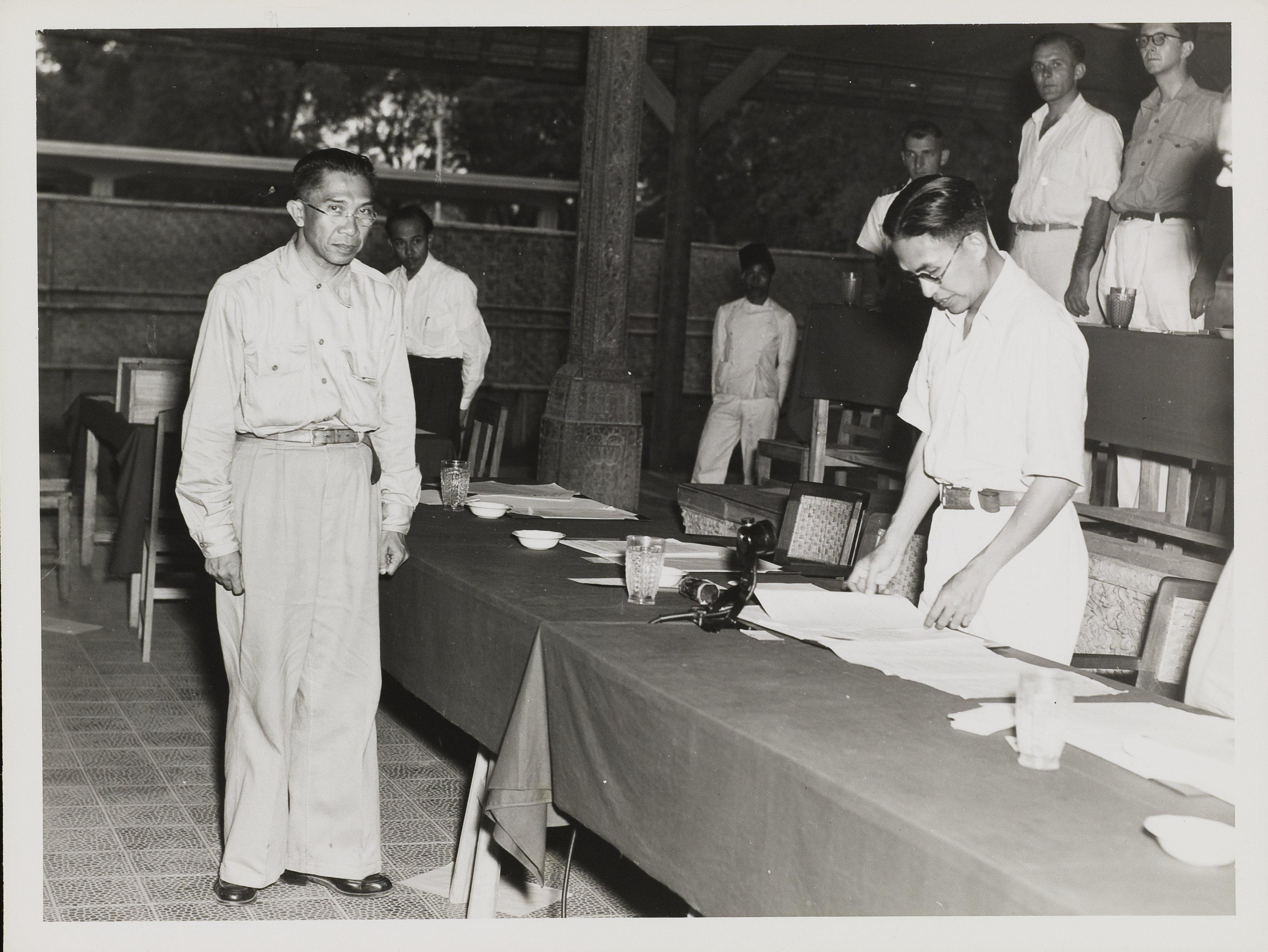
Tjokorda Gde Raka Soekawati being sworn in as president of the NIT during the Denpasar Conference

The oath of office established in the Denpasar Conference for the president was as follows:

In the name of God Almighty, I swear to the East Indonesian people that I will always protect and uphold the regulations on forming the State of East Indonesia. I swear to protect the freedom, as well as the rights, of all peoples and citizens of this country, and will utilize all methods given me by the laws and other regulations to guarantee and promote public and private prosperity, according to the obligations of a good leader (This I promise).

== List of presidents ==
No.	Portrait	Name (born–died)	Term of office		Ref.
No.	Portrait	Name (born–died)	Start	End	Ref.
1		Tjokorda Gde Raka Soekawati (1899–1967)	24 December 1946	16 August 1950	

=== Acting presidents ===
No.	Portrait	Name (born–died)	Term of office		Ref.
No.	Portrait	Name (born–died)	Start	End	Ref.
–		Muhammad Kaharuddin III (1902–1975)	11 August 1947	24 September 1947	
–		Husain Puang Limboro (1906–Unknown)	3 May 1950	16 August 1950	
