= Paruman Agung =

Regional parliament of Bali from 1938 to 1950

Paruman Agung ᬧᬭᬸᬫᬦ᭄ᬅᬕᬸᬂ

Type
- Type: Unicameral

History
- Founded: Septembar 30, 1938; January 29, 1946
- Disbanded: September 25, 1950
- Preceded by: Sutyo Renmei; Indonesian National Committee of Lesser Sunda
- Succeeded by: Bali Regional House of Representatives

Leadership
- Speaker: G. A. W. Ch. de Haze Winkelman (first); Pandji Tisna (last)
- Deputy Speaker: Ida Anak Agung Gde Agung
- Seats: 40

The Paruman Agung (Balinese: ᬧᬭᬸᬫᬦ᭄ᬅᬕᬸᬂ, lit. 'Great Meeting' or 'Big Meeting') was the regional parliament of Bali from 1938 until 1950. This was the first legislative body owned by Bali during the Dutch colonial administration and Japanese occupation until the Indonesian independence which was later replaced by the Bali Regional House of Representatives.

== History ==
=== Dutch East Indies (1938–1942) ===
On 1 July 1938, with the decision of the Governor-General of the Dutch East Indies, the eight kingdoms of Bali were re-established. The kings of Bali were inaugurated two days earlier in a ceremony at the Besakih Temple. The kings of the eight kingdoms became members of the Paruman Agung, which was established on 30 September 1938.

During this era, the Paruman Agung was composed of nine members, consisting of the speaker, who was a Resident of Bali and Lombok, and the eight members. Each king was assisted by two advisors. The Paruman Agung also had a secretary, who was appointed by the members and with the approval of the speaker.

=== Japanese occupation (1942–1945) ===
During the Japanese occupation, the Paruman Agung was changed to Sutyo Renmei. not dissolved but became inactive. There were no changes relating to the composition.

=== Dissolution of the Paruman Agung (1945–1946) ===
After the independence of Indonesia, the government of Indonesia began to set up the regional government in Bali. The Province of Lesser Sunda, which has its capital in Singaraja, was formed. On 18 August 1945, President Sukarno appointed Ida Bagus Putra Manuaba as the Speaker of the Indonesian National Committee of Lesser Sunda, and on 22 August 1945, Sukarno appointed I Gusti Ketut Pudja as the Governor of Lesser Sunda. Pudja returned to Bali on 23 August 1945 and discussed the future of Bali and its political structure.

Pudja promised that the government in the kingdoms would be run by the Regional Indonesian National Committee in cooperation with the kings, and the government in Bali would be run by the Indonesian National Committee of Lesser Sunda in cooperation with the Governor of Lesser Sunda. Even though Pudja thought that the power share was a fair share between the republic and kingdoms in Bali, some of the kings broke their trust with the Republic of Indonesia and eventually refused to cooperate with the republican government.

Meanwhile, the Dutch, under the AMACAB (Allied Military Administration-Civil Affairs Branch), who had arrived in Bali between October 1945 and February 1946, promised the kings that they would obtain full power in return for their rejection of the independence of Indonesia and support of the Dutch. The alliance between the Dutch and the local kings made the republican government weaker, and on 29 January 1946, Pudja handed over its power to the Council of Kings. The Paruman Agung was formed shortly after.

=== Pre-election Paruman Agung (1946–1948) ===
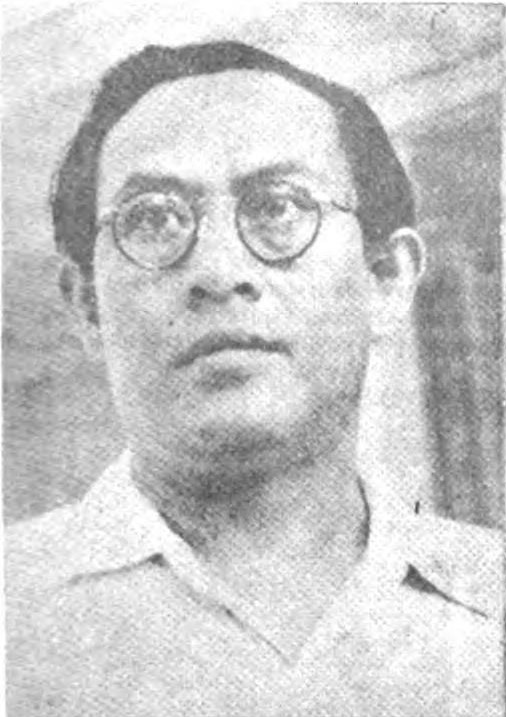
Anak Agung Nyoman Pandji Tisna (pictured) was elected as the Speaker of the Paruman Agung.

On 4 February 1946, the structure of the Paruman Agung was re-formed, with an additional 28 members and the removal of the residents of Bali and Lombok from the position. The total membership of the Paruman Agung was set at 36 persons, and the King of Buleleng, Anak Agung Nyoman Pandji Tisna, was appointed as speaker. I Gusti Bagus Oka was appointed as the secretary of the Paruman Agung.

On 4 June 1946, the Chief Commanding Officer (CCO) of the AMACAB summoned the Paruman Agung to a meeting in Denpasar. The CCO informed them about the Malino Conference and stated that the parliament must elect two delegates to the conference. The Paruman Agung elected Tjokorda Gde Raka Soekawati and I Gusti Bagus Oka as the delegates. The Paruman Agung also demanded that a group of advisors should assist the delegates, and thus a group of three, consisting of Pandji Tisna, Ide Anak Agung Gde Agung, and Gde Panetja, was sent to advise the delegates.

The Paruman Agung decided that Bali should be a separate state inside the federal Indonesia. The decision was sent to the delegates so that the delegates demanded a separate state. During the conference, the leader of the conference, Hubertus van Mook, disagreed with the demand and stated that Bali should be included in the State of East Indonesia. The delegates returned to Bali and debated the decision by van Mook to include Bali in the State of East Indonesia. The Paruman Agung agreed to change their decision, and the delegates were sent back to the conference with the new decision.

On 4 November 1946, the Paruman Agung held another session to elect seven delegates for the Denpasar Conference: Anak Agung Ngurah Ketut Jelantik, Tjokorda Gde Raka Soekawati, I Gusti Bagus Oka, Gde Panetja, Ide Anak Agung Gde Agung, Made Mendra, and Anak Agung Nyoman Pandji Tisna. The conference resulted in the establishment of the State of East Indonesia on 24 December 1946, and Soekawati was elected as the President of the State of East Indonesia.

The Paruman Agung met again on 28 December 1946 with the agenda of the formulation of a new law for the election of the parliament. The kings in the Paruman Agung would be separated to form a new body, called the Council of Kings. The law would give Paruman Agung powers to formulate laws, and the speaker of the Paruman Agung would be chosen by its members.

In addition to that, the Paruman Agung would consist of 40 members, with 34 being elected and 6 being appointed from the minority groups in Bali.

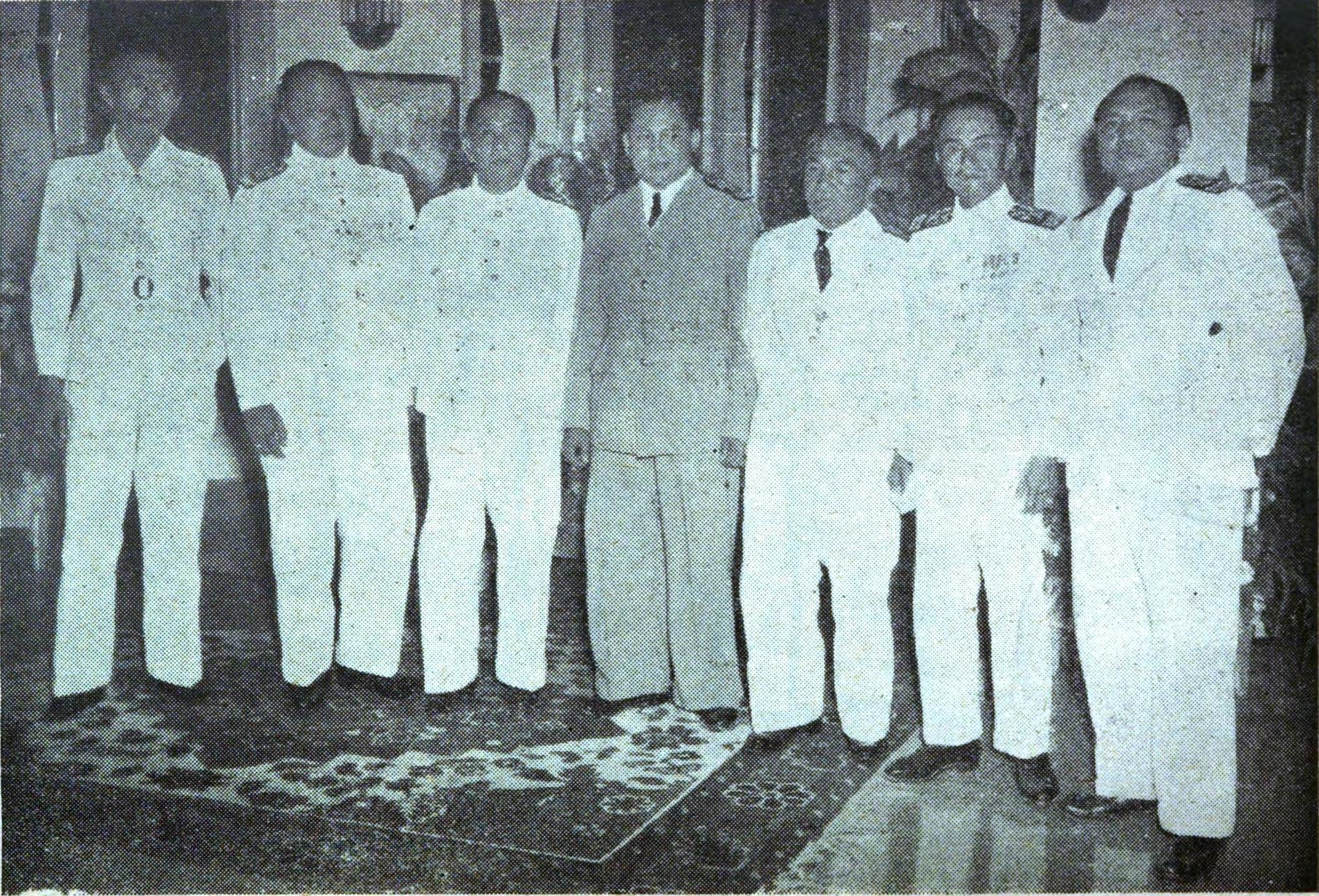
Members of the Council of Kings. From left to right: King of Jembrana (Anak Agung Bagus Negara), King of Badung (Tjokorda Ngurah Gede Pemetjutan), King of Klungkung (Dewa Agung Oka Geg), King of Gianyar (Ide Anak Agung Gede Oka), King of Bangli (Anak Agung Ketut Ngurah), King of Karangasem (Anak Agung Agung Anglurah Ketut Karangasem), King of Buleleng (Anak Agung Ngurah Ketut Jelantik), King of Tabanan (Cokorda Ngurah Gede

== Election ==
=== Regulations ===
The Paruman Agung decided that the electoral system should be an indirect election, and the people would vote for an electoral college (wali pemilih), which in turn would elect the members of the parliament. Those who had the right to vote were those who had already paid the road tax. Those who were imprisoned or in debt were not allowed to vote. Furthermore, only those who were above 25 years old and were able to read and write could vote. The voting districts were divided by perbekelans (group of villages), and every 1000 voters in a perbekelan would be represented by an elector.

The Buleleng, Badung, Gianyar, and Karangasem kingdoms were each represented by 5 members in the Paruman Agung, while the Djembrana, Klungkung, and Bangli kingdoms were each represented by 3 members.

=== Turnout ===
Elections were held in several phases, from 19 until 26 April 1947. The first phase of the elections was held in the Tabanan Kingdom from 19 to 20 April, while the last phase of the election was held in the Badung Kingdom on 26 April.

=== Rejection of results ===
On 9 June and 10 July 1947, the Council of Kings held a meeting in which they declared the election results in Badung and Buleleng null and void. They stated that the electors from the region consisted of pro-republicans (whom they termed "extremists") and that the extremists had exerted pressure which prevented free elections.

Even though the election results were annulled, there were demands for a new democratically elected Paruman Agung. Thus, in September 1948, a new election was held for the Badung and Buleleng kingdoms.

== Post-election Paruman Agung ==
On 15 November 1948, the new democratically elected members of the Paruman Agung were installed. The inauguration was attended by the kings in Bali, the Residents of Bali and Lombok, and the troop commander of the Dutch forces.

Under the law, the Paruman Agung nominated three candidates for speaker of Paruman Agung. The nominees were I Gusti Ktut Ngurah, Ida Bagus Putra Manuaba, and the Anak Agung Nyoman Pandji Tisna. Pandji Tisna, the previous speaker, was elected to the position. I Gusti Putu Gde Kuntri was appointed by the parliament as secretary of the Paruman Agung.

== Powers ==
According to the law regarding the political structure of Bali, the Paruman Agung has four main functions: proposing a bill (petition and initiative), amending the bill (amendment), and questioning the government (interpellation). In addition to that, the members of the Paruman Agung are granted parliamentary immunity.

In practice, according to I Made Sendra, a lecturer from Udayana University, the Council of Kings is more powerful than the Paruman Agung. The Paruman Agung rarely uses their initiative and interpellation rights, thus making the parliament merely an advisory body. He stated that this causes no real separation of powers between the Council of Kings and the Paruman Agung.

== Dissolution ==
After the formation of the United States of Indonesia, demands to dissolve the Paruman Agung increased. At a congress in Campuhan Ubud from 14 to 17 April 1950, one of the demands was to replace the Paruman Agung with a more democratic legislature. Thus, on 8 June 1950, the Paruman Agung held an emergency meeting to form an executive body, consisting of five members, based on the demands of the people. The Paruman Agung appointed three form auteurs for the executive body. These formateurs would appoint two members from the parliament and two members from outside the parliament, and the chairman of the executive body was the chairman of the Council of Kings. The executive body consisted of Anak Agung Gede Oka as its chairman, I Gusti Putu Merta handling political affairs, I Gusti Gede Subamia handling social affairs, I Wayan Dangin handling economic affairs, and I Wayan Bhadra handling general affairs. This executive body was still responsible to the Paruman Agung and the Council of Kings.

Several weeks after the executive council was formed, the Putuhena Cabinet in the State of Indonesia enacted a new law regarding political structures in all regions of the State of East Indonesia. The Minister of Internal Affairs, Lanto Daeng Pasewang, went to Bali to explain how the law should be implemented. Thus, on 7 August 1950, the government of Bali formed a new committee for the implementation of the law. The committee consisted of five members representing pro-republican political groups: I Gde Putra Kamayana from the Indonesian National Party, Raden Sujono from Masyumi, I Gde Puger from KPNI, and the pro-federalist representatives I Gusti Putu Merta from the government and Anak Agung Gede Djelantik from the kings. The committee decided to dissolve the Paruman Agung, and on 25 September 1950, the Paruman Agung was dissolved, and the Bali Regional People's Representative Council was installed.

== List of speakers ==
=== Dutch East Indies (1938—1942) ===
- G. A. W. Ch. de Haze Winkelman (30 September 1938 — 11 November 1938)
- H. J. E. Moll (11 November 1938 — 1941)
- M. Boon (1941 — 1942)

=== Post-Independence (1946—1950) ===
- Anak Agung Nyoman Pandji Tisna (4 February 1946 — 25 September 1950)

== Gallery ==
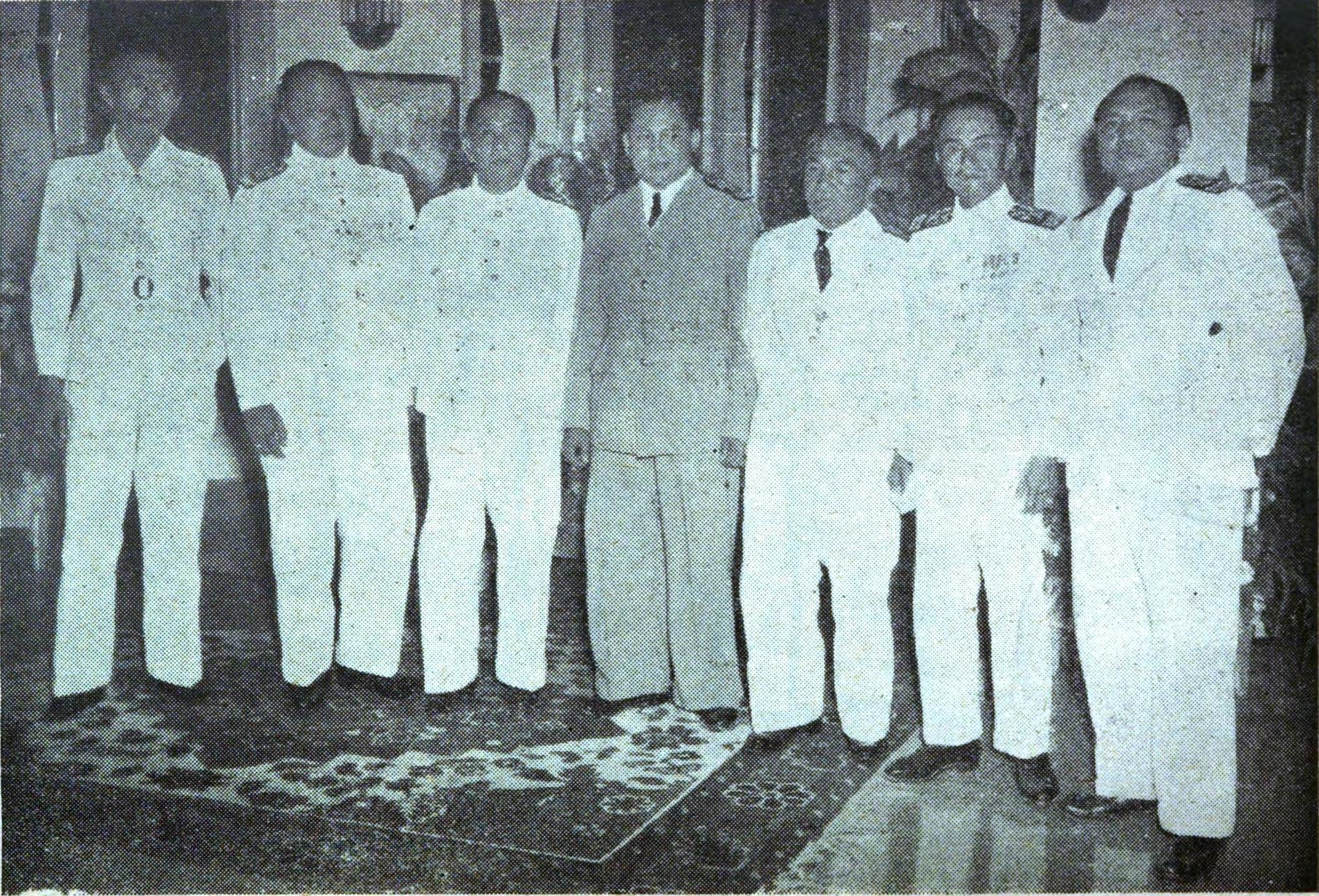
Members of the Council of Kings. From left to right: King of Jembrana (Anak Agung Bagus Negara), King of Badung (Tjokorda Ngurah Gede Pemetjutan), King of Klungkung (Dewa Agung Oka Geg), King of Gianyar (Ide Anak Agung Gede Oka), King of Bangli (Anak Agung Ketut Ngurah), King of Karangasem (Anak Agung Agung Anglurah Ketut Karangasem), King of Buleleng (Anak Agung Ngurah Ketut Jelantik), King of Tabanan (Cokorda Ngurah Gede)

== Bibliography ==
- Ministry of Information of East Indonesia (1949). Bali Membuat Sedjarah Baru, 1938-1948 (in Indonesian).
- Ministry of Information of Indonesia (1953). Sunda Ketjil. Jakarta.
- Ardhana, I Ketut (December 1993). BALINESE PURI IN HISTORICAL PERSPECTIVE: The Role of Puri Satria and Puri Pamacutan in Social and Political Changes in Badung, South Bali, 1906 - 1950 (PDF). The Australian National University.
- Sendra, I Made (April 2013), Pergolakan Elite dalam Panggung Politik di Bali 1945-1950, Jurnal Kajian Bali
- Picard, Michael (2011), "Balinese religion in search of recognition: From Agama Hindu Bali to Agama Hindu (1945-1965)", Bijdragen tot de Taal-, Land- en Volkenkunde / Journal of the Humanities and Social Sciences of Southeast Asia, 167 (4), Royal Netherlands Institute of Southeast Asian and Caribbean Studies: 482–510, doi:10.1163/22134379-90003581, S2CID 170206045
- Wirawan, A.A. Bagus (February 2008), Respons Lokal terhadap Revolusi Indonesia di Sunda Kecil, 1945-1950 (PDF), Humaniora
