= Provisional Representative Body of East Indonesia =

Provisional legislature from 1946 to 1950

Provisional Parliament of East Indonesia Parlemen Sementara Negara Indonesia Timur
- Coat of arms of East Indonesia

- Flag of East Indonesia

History
- Founded: 26 December 1946
- Disbanded: 16 August 1950

Leadership
- Speaker: Tadjuddin Noor, South Sulawesi

Structure
- Seats: 70
- Length of term: 4 years

Meeting place
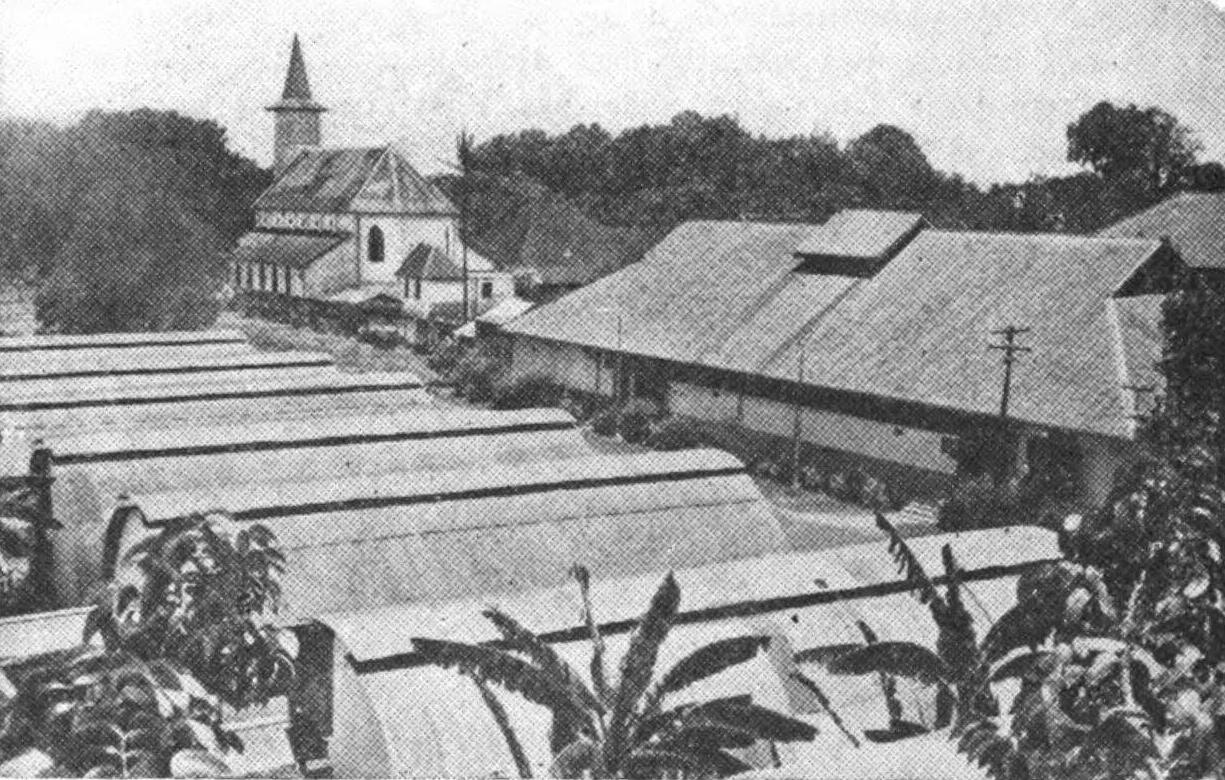
- NIT parliament building, Makassar

Constitution
- Denpasar Regulation

The Provisional Representative Body of East Indonesia was the lower house of the legislature of the State of East Indonesia, a constituent of the United States of Indonesia. It was formed at the Denpasar Conference in 1946, and dissolved in 1950.

== Background ==
On 17 August 1945, at the end of the Japanese occupation of the Dutch East Indies, Indonesian nationalist leader Sukarno declared Indonesian independence. The Dutch, having reoccupied most of the eastern island of the archipelago proposed instead a federal state, with the region known as the Great East forming the State of East Indonesia. This was officially formed at the Denpasar Conference, held in Bali in December 1946.

== Establishment of the provisional parliament ==
The Denpasar Conference, organized by Acting Governor-General of the Dutch East Indies Hubertus van Mook to formulate the State of East Indonesia opened on 7 December 1947. A total of 70 delegates from all 13 regions attended. Some of these had been appointed by regional representative bodies, others by election boards and a further 15, representing ethnic minorities) directly by van Mook himself. Representation was based on population size. The composition of was as follows:

Region	Delegates
South Sulawesi	16
Minahasa	3
North Sulawesi	2
Central Sulawesi (Donggala)	2
Central Sulawesi (Poso)	2
Sangihe & Talaud	2
North Moluccas	2
South Moluccas	3
Bali	7
Lombok	5
Timor	3
Flores	3
Sumbawa	3
Sumba	2
Ethnic minorities	15
Total	70

On 24 December 1946, the last day of the conference, Tadjuddin Noor, one of the representatives from South Sulawesi, was elected speaker of the provisional parliament. It was then decreed by van Mook that the 70 conference delegates would form the provisional parliament, and all members were sworn in. Tadjuddin Noor announced that the first session of the provisional parliament would be held in the state capital. Makassar, on 1 March 1947.

== Powers and responsibilities ==
Under the Denpasar Regulation, the provisional constitution passed at the Denpasar Conference, the provisional parliament was responsible for electing the president (except for the first time, when he was elected by the Denpasar Conference). Under the proposed 1949 constitution, this responsibility would have been shared with the Senate and regional representatives. Although the president appointed and dismissed members of the cabinet, they were responsible to the parliament.

== Meetings of the provisional parliament ==
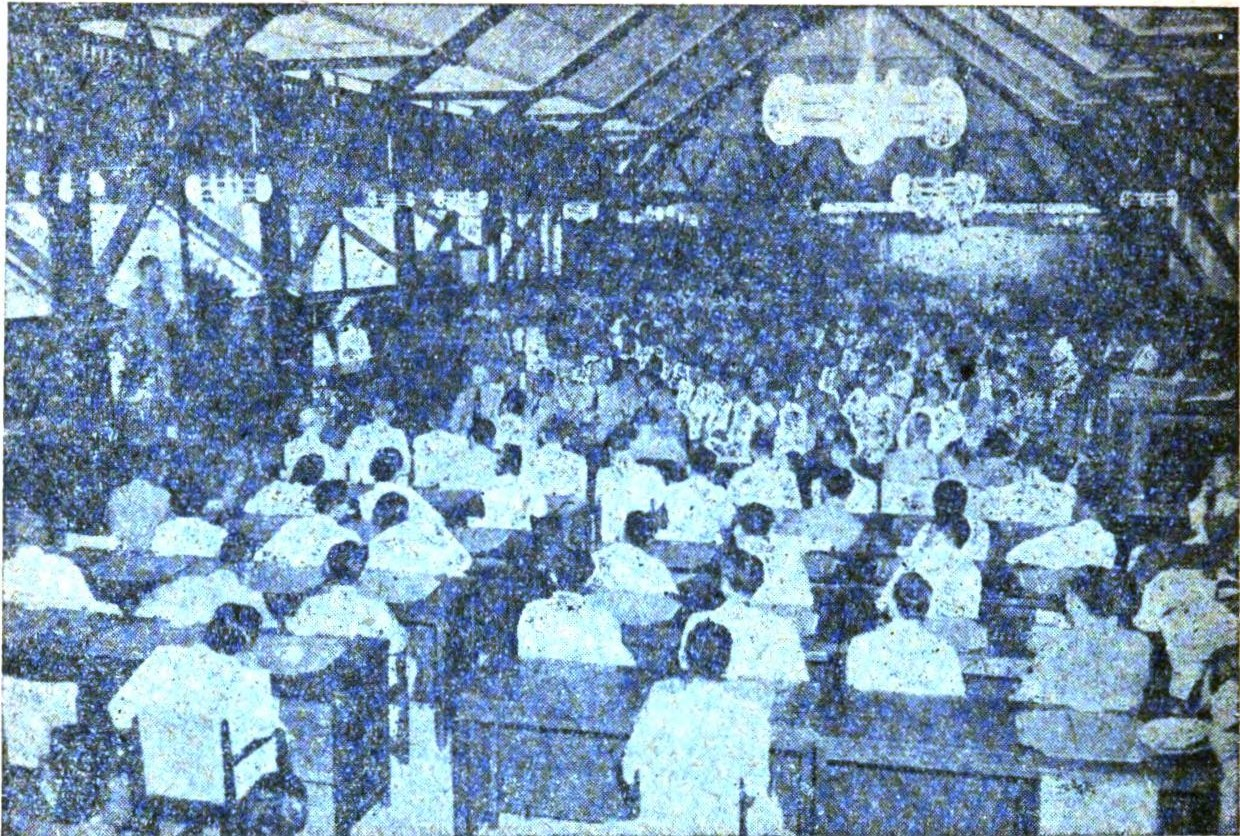
The first session of the Provisional Representative Body of East Indonesia on 23 April 1947

The first session opened on 22 April 1947, with a speech from President Soekawati, in which he urged members to avoid factional quarrels and announced the formation of a body to work on a definitive constitution. Members discussed proposed laws. In a second session the same year, the body passed a 98-article law covering its procedures, including committees and its relationship with the government. There were two sessions in 1948. In early 1949 the parliament fixed its composition at 60 elected and 10 appointed members. It also passed a law that detailed the procedures for the election of a definitive legislature.

== Factions ==
At the first session, the members of the Provisional Representative Body formed two opposing factions. The 32 members who had voted for the pro-Republic figure Speaker Tadjuddin Noor as head of state at the Denpasar Conference formed the Progressive Faction, and chose South Sulawesi representative Abdullah Daeng Mappoedji as their leader. This faction acted as the opposition. Meanwhile the other 37 members formed the Development Faction, and was led by Sonda Daeng Mattajang, also from South Sulawesi. This faction tended to support the government. Membership of these factions was not fixed due to, among together reasons, a lack of party discipline to unite them.

In the period before the second session, there were changes in allegiances following the fall of the Nadjamuddin cabinet. The Progressive Faction increased in size to 34 members and named A. Mononoetoe as its chair. Although he was pro-unitary state, he supported the federal united States of Indonesia, as did the 17-member National Faction. The Democratic Coalition, with 20 members, faction did not announce a political program. Of the remaining members, three formed the Indo-European Alliance, and six did not join any faction.

== Elections and a new parliament ==
From September 1949, elections were held throughout East Indonesia to elect a definitive parliament. These were planned for completion by December. The provisional parliament decided that once it had completed its ongoing deliberations over proposed laws concerning matters such as the state budget, it would go into recess until the day before the first session of the elected parliament. This final session took place on 20 February 1950.

Republicans candidates did well in the elections, and won about half the seats. Only about a quarter of the previous members were re-elected. The new parliament met on 27 February 1950 and elected Hoesain Poeang Limboro as its speaker. The new members were sworn in on 2 March. Members grouped themselves into five factions:

- National Progressive (Nasional Progressief): pro-federalism, approximately 25 members
- National Unitarian (Kesatuan Nasional): pro-unitary state, approximately 20 members
- Populist (Kerakyatan): from the South Moluccas and surrounding areas, 10 members
- Indonesian: pro-unitary state, 8 members
- Socialist, 3 members

== Dissolution ==
There was increasing opposition to the federal form of the state from the constituent entities of the United States of Indonesia, and calls for a unitary state. Over the first few months of 1950, one by one the component parts dissolved themselves into the Republic of Indonesia. On 17 August 1950, the State of East Indonesia handed over its powers and became part of a unitary Republic of Indonesia. The parliament was dissolved on the same day.
