= Pandji Tisna =

Indonesian writer and royal (1908–1978)

Anak Agung Pandji Tisna ᬅᬦᬓ᭄ᬅᬕᬸᬂᬧᬦ᭄ᬤ᭄ᬚᬶᬢᬶᬲ᭄ᬦ
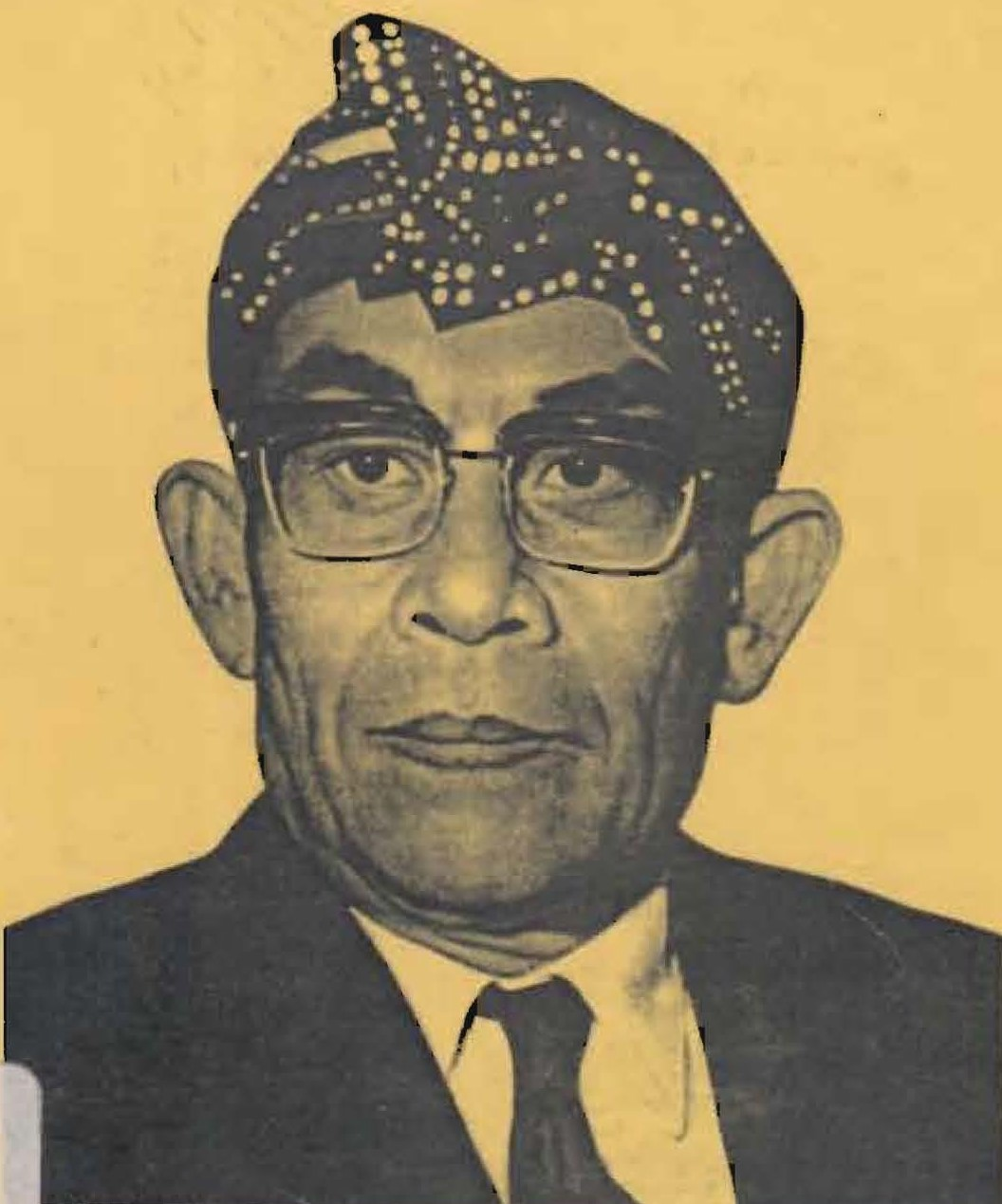
- Formal portrait, 1930

Member of the House of Representatives
- In office 21 August 1950 – 26 May 1951
- Succeeded by: Gde Ngurah Rai

Speaker of the Paruman Agung In office 4 February 1946 – 25 September 1950
- Predecessor: M.Boon
- Successor: Position eliminated

15th King of Buleleng
- Reign: 1944 – 1947
- Predecessor: Anak Agung Putu Jelantik
- Successor: Anak Agung Ngurah Ketut Jelantik
- Born: February 11, 1908 Buleleng, Bali
- Died: June 2, 1978 (aged 70)
- House: Panji Sakti

Political career

Personal details
- Party: PRN (until 1951)

Anak Agung Pandji Tisna (Balinese: ᬅᬦᬓ᭄ᬅᬕᬸᬂᬧᬦ᭄ᬤ᭄ᬚᬶᬢᬶᬲ᭄ᬦ; 11 February 1908 – 2 June 1978), also known as Anak Agung Njoman Pandji Tisna, I Gusti Njoman Pandji Tisna, or just Pandji Tisna, was the 11th descendant of the Panji Sakti dynasty of Buleleng, Singaraja, which is in the northern part of Bali, Indonesia. He succeeded his father, Anak Agung Putu Djelantik, in 1944.

On the last page of Pandji Tisna's book, I Made Widiadi, written in 1955, he wrote his life story in chronological order. He was a writer and a novelist. He refused to be the king of Buleleng, but being the eldest son, the Japanese occupancy troops forced him to be "syucho" after the death of his father in 1944.

During his reign, he became the leader of the Council of Kings of all of Bali from 1946 to 1947 (Paruman Agung) and the Regent of Buleleng. In 1947, because his uniquely Christian faith did not fit in with the predominant Hindu religion, Pandji Tisna surrendered the throne to his younger brother, Anak Agung Ngurah Ketut Djelantik or I Gusti Ketut Djelantik, also known as Meester Djelantik, until 1949.

He died 2 June 1978 and was buried in the graveyard on the eastern side of his land near the chapel he built years before.

== Early years ==
Anak Agung Pandji Tisna was born to Anak Agung Putu Djelantik and his wife Jero Mekele Rengga.

Pandji Tisna received his formal education in a primary school in Singaraja and continued his education in a middle school in Batavia.

== Career ==
Pandji Tisna is best known as a novelist. His novels, all of which are placed in Bali, especially in Singaraja, his birthplace, were published by Balai Pustaka. Many of his short stories were published in the Terang Bulan magazine in Surabaya. He also wrote poems, such as Ni Poetri, which was published by Sutan Takdir Alisyahbana in Poedjangga Baroe magazine in Jakarta.

Pandji Tisna had a varied career as a merchant, secretary to his father, headmaster of an elementary school, editor of Jatayu magazine, and farmer, before succeeding to the throne on the death of his father on 25 July 1944. He was Chair of the Balinese Council of Kings from 1946 to 1947, but abdicated in favour of his brother, Meester Djelantik, in 1947.

He was a member of the Provisional Parliament of the State of East Indonesia from 1946 to 1948.

== Balinese tourism ==
Pandji Tisna is also remembered as a pioneer of Balinese tourism, especially in the northern beach district. In 1953, he chose Desa Tukad Cebol (now Desa Kaliasem [Kaliasem Village]) as his holiday home. There he wrote and received both local and foreign guests. He named his holiday home Lovina, which is an abbreviation of the words Love Indonesia. He then built several guest houses on the western coast in Buleleng. The whole area then became known as Pantai Lovina, or Lovina Beach in English. For this reason, he is accredited as "The Father of Balinese Tourism". In 2003, the Balinese government posthumously awarded him the Karya Karana Award in recognition of his services to the development of Balinese tourism.

== Family ==
Pandji Tisna had four wives, Anak Agung Istri Manik, with whom he had two sons; Ni Ketut Mayas (Jero Mekele Seroja), with whom he had two sons and 1 daughter; Luh Sayang (Mekele Sadpada), with whom he had two sons; and Jro Mekele Resmi, with whom he had 4 sons and two daughters.

== Major works ==
- I Made Widiadi (Kembali kepada Tuhan) (1955)
- I Swasta Setahun di Bedahulu (1938)
- Sukreni Gadis Bali (1936), work was first published in the Balinese language. It has subsequently been translated into other languages with the following titles:
  - Bali Taruniyan Dedenekuge Kathawa, a Sinhala language edition, a translation by Dr. P. G. Punchihewa.
  - The Rape of Sukreni, an English edition, a translation by George Quinn.
- Ni Rawit Ceti Penjual Orang (1935)
  - Panglajar Djadi Tjoelik a Sundanese 1940 edition, a translation by Soerjana.
