= Eastern Indonesia =

Main geographical region of Indonesia

Eastern Indonesia Indonesia Timur
- Region
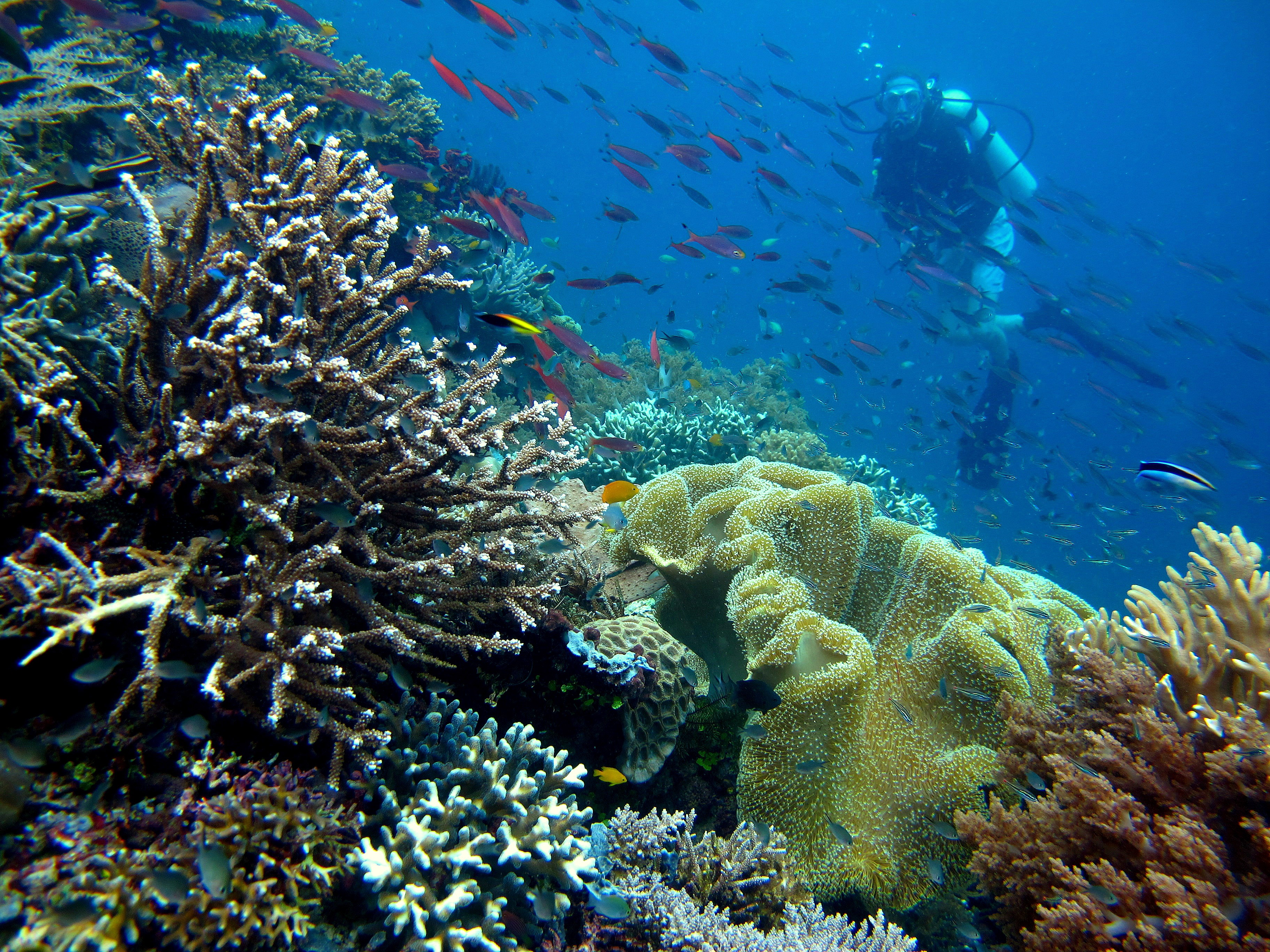
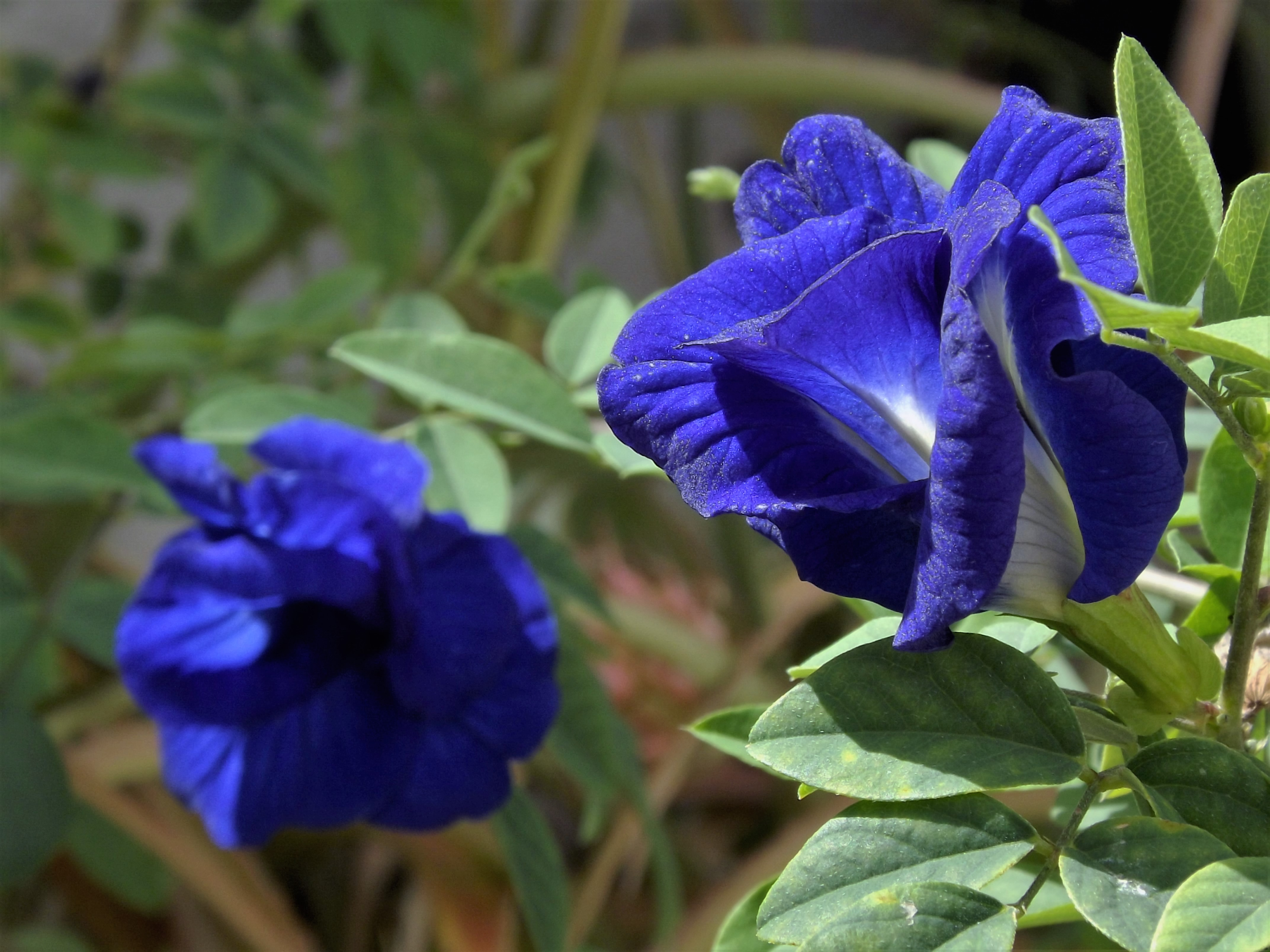
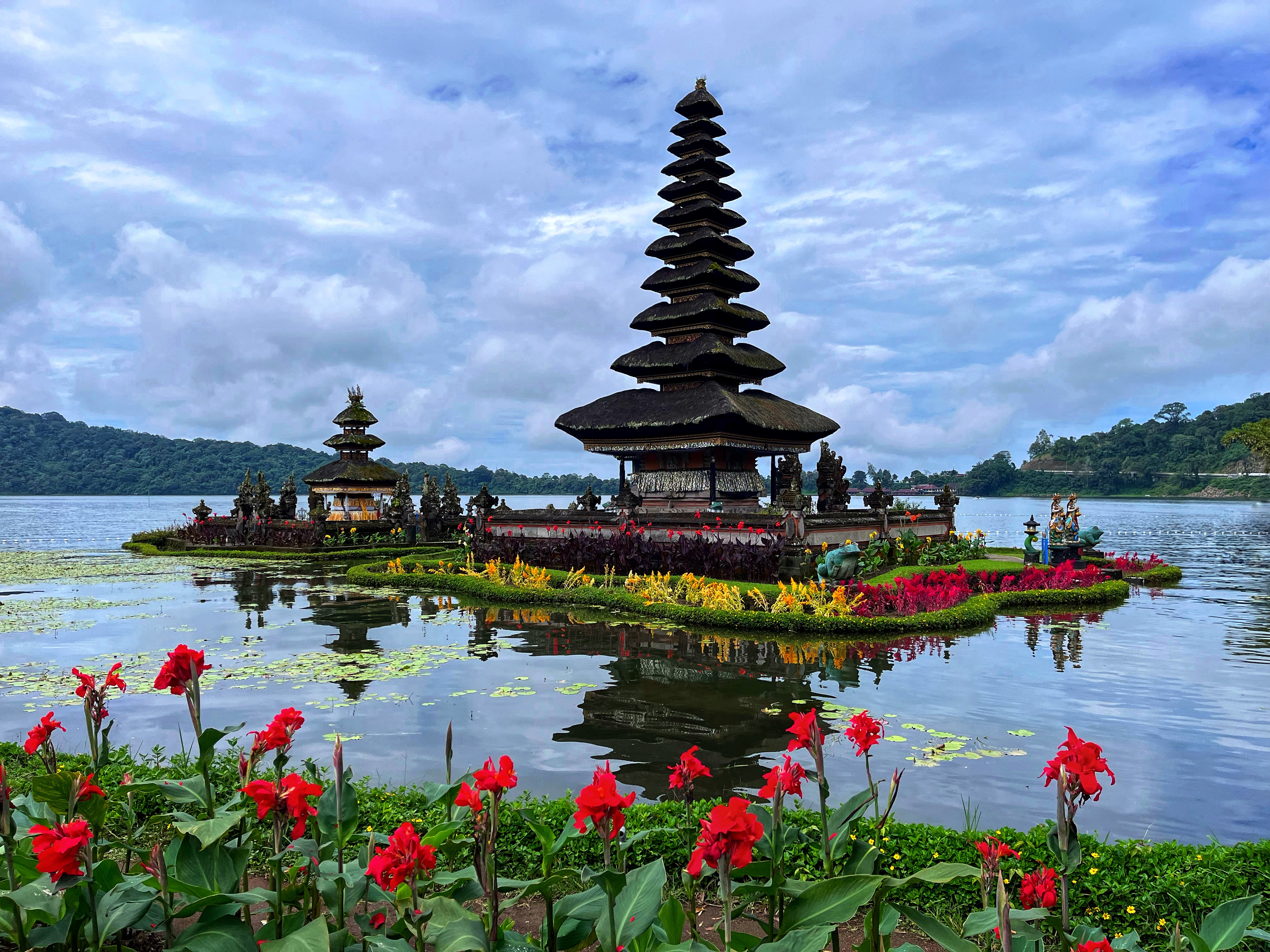
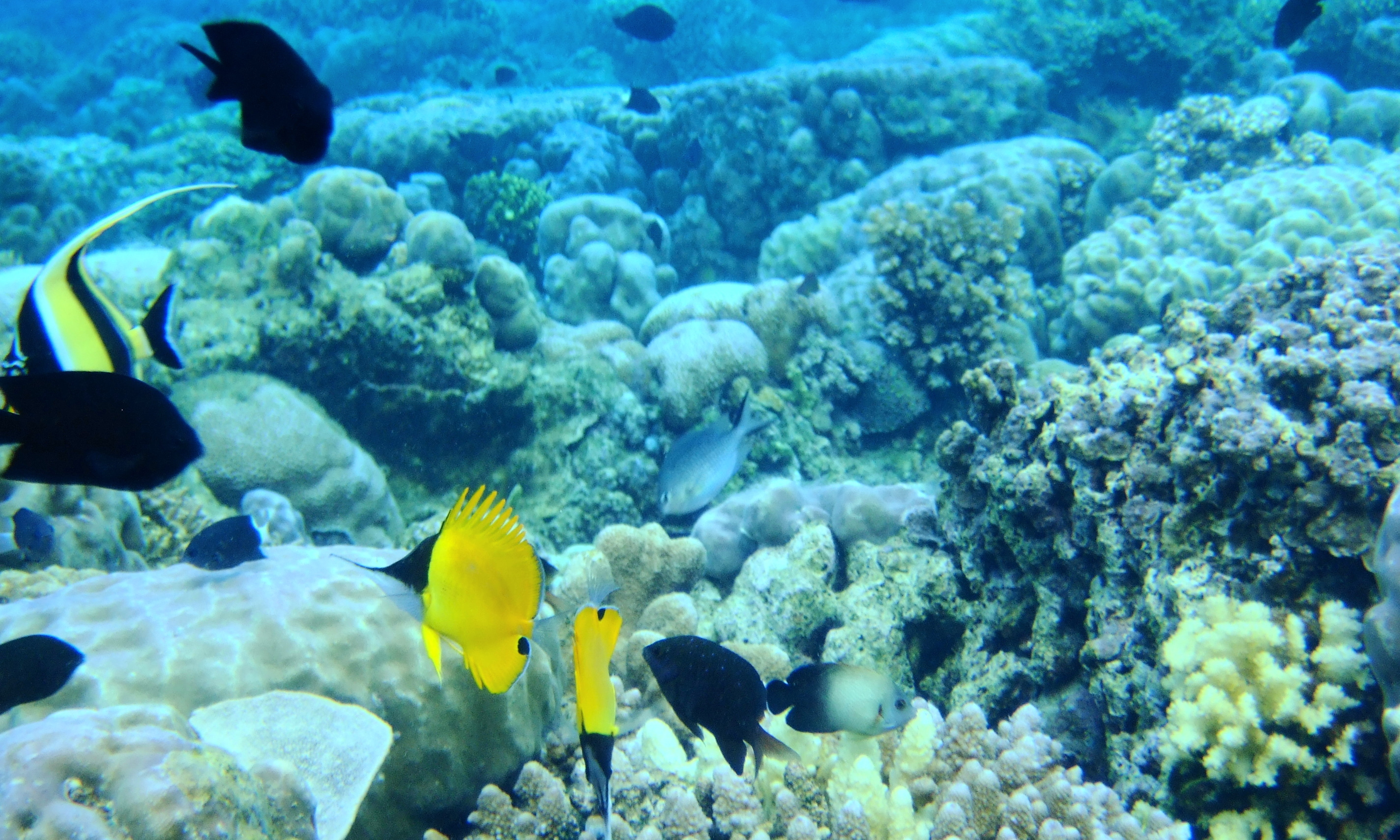
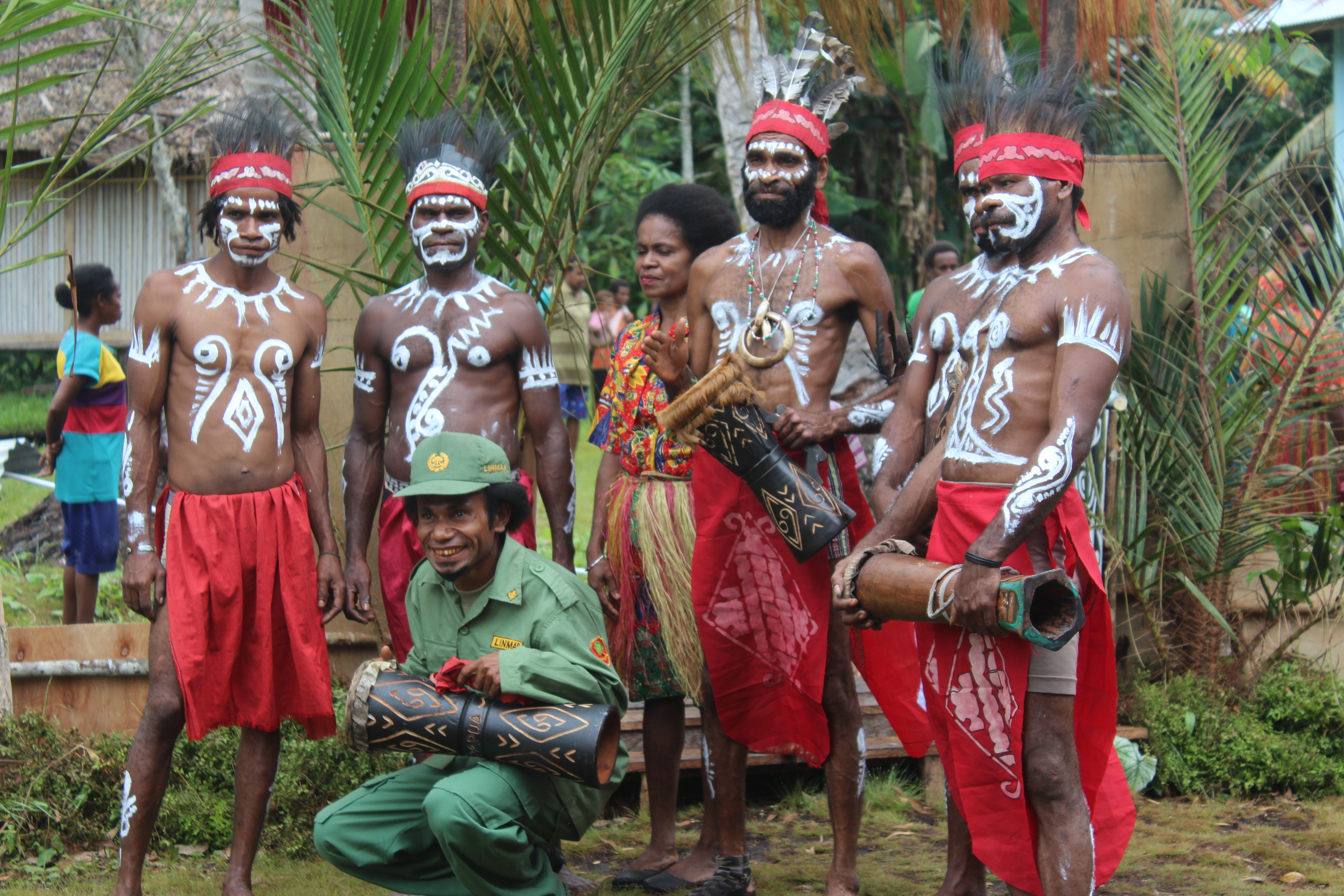
- From upper-left to lower-right: Diving experience in Piaynemo Island of Raja Ampat, Clitoria ternatea (the native flower of Ternate Island), Ulun Danu Bratan Temple (Bali's most popular Hindu temple); Bunaken Coral (the very rich coral ecosystem covers in Eastern Indonesia (Bunaken Island)); A Papuan man wearing traditional Papuan clothing

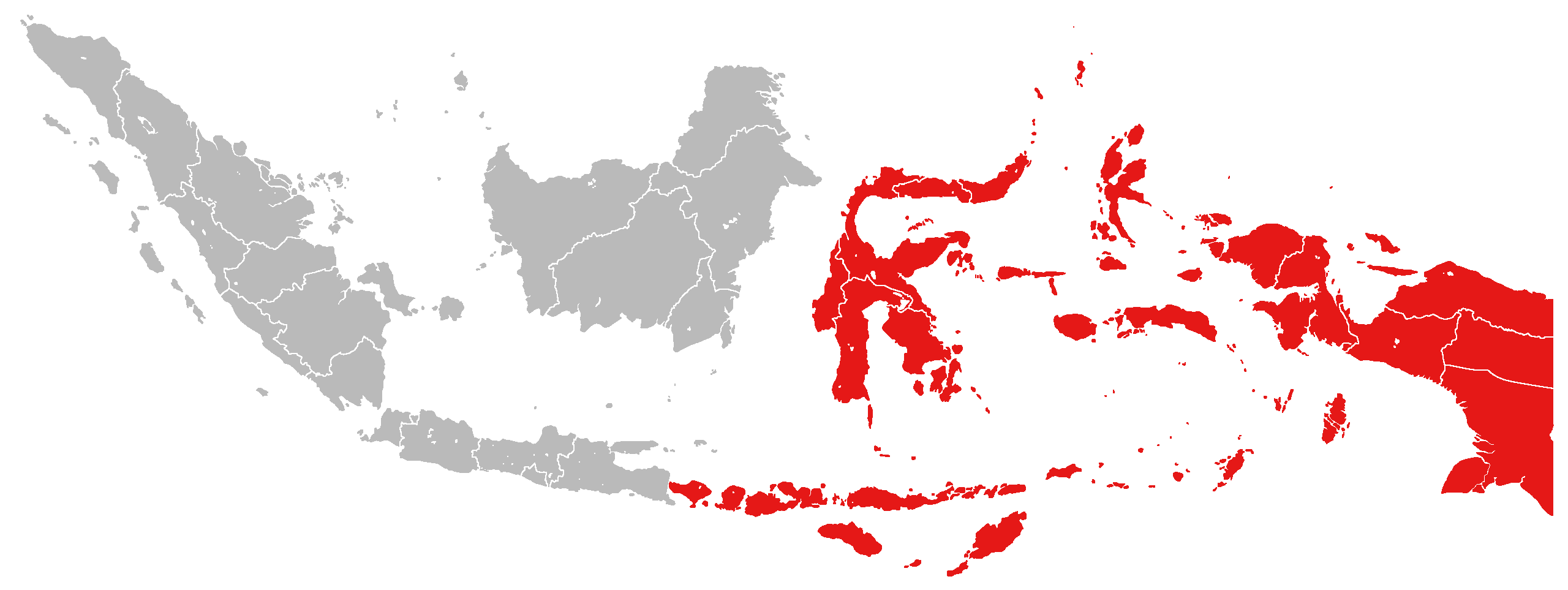
- Eastern Indonesia
- Country: Indonesia
- Provinces: North Sulawesi; Gorontalo; Central Sulawesi; West Sulawesi; South Sulawesi; Southeast Sulawesi; Bali; West Nusa Tenggara; East Nusa Tenggara; Maluku; North Maluku; Southwest Papua; West Papua; Central Papua; Papua; Highland Papua; South Papua
- Largest city: Makassar
- Other major cities: Denpasar; Kupang; Manado; Mataram; Jayapura; Palu; Ambon; Kendari; Sorong; Gorontalo; Ternate

Area
  - Total: 3,973,245 km^{2} (1,534,078 sq mi)
  - Land: 573,245 km^{2} (221,331 sq mi)
  - Water: 3,400,000 km^{2} (1,300,000 sq mi)

Population (2025 estimate)
  - Total: 29,400,000
  - Density: 51.3/km^{2} (133/sq mi)
- Demonym: Eastern Indonesians
- Time zones: UTC+08:00 (Central Indonesia Time)
- UTC+09:00 (Eastern Indonesia Time)
- Official language: Indonesian
- Other regional languages: Buginese; Balinese; Sasak; Makassarese; Minahasan; Gorontalo; Uab Meto; Manggarai; Bima; Sumbawa; Tetum; Ambonese Malay; Papuan Malay; Manado Malay etc.

Eastern Indonesia (or East Indonesia; Indonesian: Indonesia Timur, pronounced [ɪndoˌnes(i)ja ˈt̪imʊr]) is one of the two main geographical regions of Indonesia, the other being Western Indonesia. It comprises four geographical units: Lesser Sunda Islands, Sulawesi, Maluku Islands and Papua. Central Indonesian Time and Eastern Indonesia Time are the national standard time designated for Eastern Indonesia; it falls within the UTC+8 and UTC+9 time zone, respectively.

Eastern Indonesia borders the Southern Philippines and Palau in the North, Papua New Guinea in the East, and Northern Australia in the South.

== History and background ==
During the last stages of the Dutch colonial era, the area east of Java and Kalimantan was known as the Great East and later known as Eastern Indonesia. After Denpasar Conference, on 24 December 1946, the State of East Indonesia was formed, covering the same area, excluding Western New Guinea, previously included during Malino Conference. It was a component of the United States of Indonesia, and was dissolved into the unitary Republic of Indonesia in 17 August 1950 . Currently, Eastern Indonesia consists of 17 provinces: Bali, East Nusa Tenggara, West Nusa Tenggara, Central Sulawesi, Gorontalo, North Sulawesi, South Sulawesi, Southeast Sulawesi, West Sulawesi, Maluku, North Maluku, Central Papua, Highland Papua, Papua, South Papua, Southwest Papua, and West Papua.

== Geography ==
=== Climate ===
In Eastern Indonesia, the days are generally dry and sunny from October through March with the warm tropical rain season occurring between May and August; temperatures are typically in the 27 °C (81 °F) to 30 °C (86 °F) range throughout the year.

== Administration ==
Geographical units of Indonesia

Administratively, Eastern Indonesia consists of four main geographical units, namely the Lesser Sunda Islands, Sulawesi, Maluku Islands and Papua.

ISO 3166-2 Codes	Geographical unit	Provinces	Population (mid-2022)	Largest city	Highest point
ID-NU	Nusa Tenggara (Lesser Sunda Islands)	Bali, West Nusa Tenggara, and East Nusa Tenggara	15,355,100	Denpasar	Mount Rinjani 3,726 m (12,224 ft)
ID-SL	Sulawesi	Central Sulawesi, Gorontalo, North Sulawesi, South Sulawesi, Southeast Sulawesi, and West Sulawesi	20,304,400	Makassar	Latimojong 3,478 m (11,411 ft)
ID-ML	Maluku Islands	Maluku and North Maluku	3,201,000	Ambon	Mount Binaiya; 3,027 m (9,931 ft)
ID-PP	Papua	Central Papua, Highland Papua, Papua, South Papua, Southwest Papua, and West Papua	5,601,900	Jayapura	Puncak Jaya; 4,884 m (16,024 ft)

== Economy ==
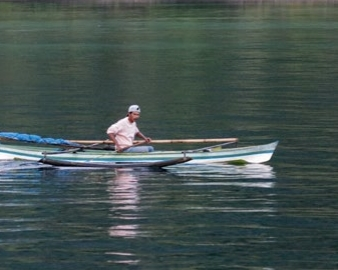
Most people in eastern Indonesia work as fisherman and most consume fish, except in Bali and East Nusa Tenggara where most people work as farmers.

Seaweed farming has traditionally been a common commercial activity along the coasts of Eastern Indonesia; however, in the 2020s climate change in Indonesia has been causing seaweed farmers in Eastern Indonesia to lose revenue and harvests. In the consumer shopping industry, Eastern Indonesia experienced a rapid increase in online shopping in the 2020s, with overall transactions in the region doubling from 2020 to 2021; this growth has been led by Indonesian e-commerce company Tokopedia, with the top product types sold in the region being health and beauty, fashion, food and beverage, and electronics.

== Demographics ==
=== Largest cities ===
The following are the four largest cities in Eastern Indonesia by population:

Largest cities in Eastern Indonesia
No.	City	Province	Population	Image
1.	Makassar	South Sulawesi	1.571.814	
2.	Denpasar	Bali	725.314	
3.	Manado	North Sulawesi	478.192	
4.	Kupang	East Nusa Tenggara	442.758	
5.	Mataram	West Nusa Tenggara	452.812	
6.	Jayapura	Papua	398.478	
7.	Palu	Central Sulawesi	373.218	
8.	Ambon	Maluku	347.288	
9.	Kendari	Southeast Sulawesi	347.381	
10.	Sorong	Southwest Papua	284.410	

== See also ==
- Regions of Indonesia
- Western Indonesia

== Bibliography ==
- Wouden, F.A.E. Van. Types Of Social Structure In Eastern Indonesia (in English and Indonesian). Leiden: Springer Netherlands. p. 189. ISBN 9789401510769.
- Fraassen, C. F. van (1976). Drie plaatsnamen uit Oost-Indonesië in de Nagara-Kertagama: Galiyao, Muar en Wwanin en de vroege handelsgeschiedenis van de Ambonse eilanden [Three place names from Eastern Indonesia in the Nagara-Kertagama: Galiyao, Muar and Wwanin and the early trade history of the Ambon Islands] (in Dutch). doi:10.1163/22134379-90002645.
- Andaya, Leonard Y. (1993). The World of Maluku: Eastern Indonesia in the Early Modern Period. Honolulu: University of Hawaii Press. p. 306.
- Williams, Catharina Purwani (2007). Maiden Voyages: Eastern Indonesian Women on the Move. Netherlands: Koninklijk Instituut voor Taal-, Land- en Volkenkunde (KITLV) Press. p. 211. ISBN 9789812303943.
- Ricklefs, M. C. (2008). A History of Modern Indonesia Since C.1200. Macmillan Education UK. ISBN 978-0-230-54686-8.
