= Provisional Senate of East Indonesia =

Provisional Senate of East Indonesia Senat Sementara Negara Indonesia Timur
- Coat of arms of East Indonesia

- Flag of East Indonesia

History
- Founded: 28 May 1949
- Disbanded: 17 August 1950

Leadership
- Speaker: W. A. Sarapil, Sangihe and Talaud
- Deputy Speaker: Johan Manusama, South Maluku

The Provisional Senate of East Indonesia (Indonesian: Senat Sementara Negara Indonesia Timur) was the upper house of the parliament of State of East Indonesia, a component of the United States of Indonesia. The Senate existed from May 1949 to August 1950, when the State of East Indonesia was dissolved into the unitary Republic of Indonesia.

== Background ==
The State of East Indonesia was formed in the Great East, the area of the Dutch East Indies that the Dutch were able to reassert control over following the Japanese surrender and the Indonesian declaration of independence in August 1945. From 18 to 24 December 1946, a conference in Denpasar was held to work out the specifics of the state, including producing a provisional constitution, the Denpasar Regulation, which included provision for a senate with unspecified powers. Two years later, at the Second Malino Conference, representatives of the self-governing regions in the State of East Indonesia met and proposed a law establishing the senate. The law was enacted in February 1949. The senate was later formed based on this 1949 Provisional Senate Act.

== Powers ==
This provisional Senate had the duty to approve, but not the right to amend, the draft constitution drawn up by the special body formed to write it following its approval by the Provisional Representative Body. After the planned constitution was enacted, the senate would have been dissolved, to make way for a definitive Senate, to be put together in accordance with the rules laid down in the constitution. The definitive senate would then give its opinion on the Constitution in a second reading. The senate duly considered the proposed constitution from August to November 1949, and approved it on 30 November.

Under the proposed definitive constitution, the Senate would have had the power to delay legislation for up to a year, although this could be overruled by a two-thirds vote in the Representative Assembly. It would act as an advisory body to the government, which would have to consult it on proposed legislation related to the self-governing areas, which the Senate could veto. However work on the new constitution stopped in early 1950 as it became apparent that East Indonesia was to be dissolved into the Republic of Indonesia.

== Members ==
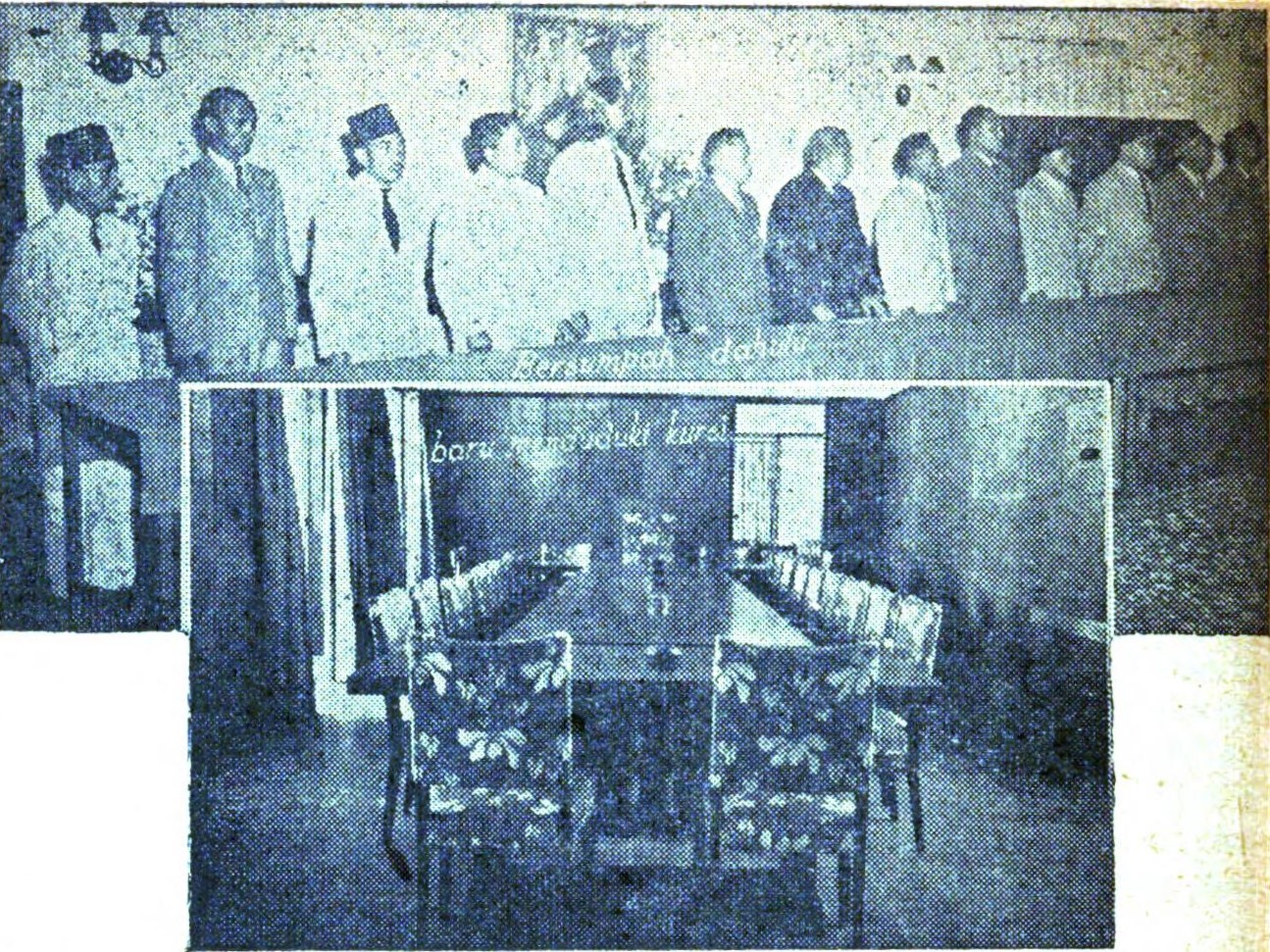
Members of the Provisional Senate of East Indonesia.

There were 13 seats in the Senate, with one seat for each region of East Indonesia. Senate elections were completed in May 1949, with members elected by the ruling bodies in each region. Ten of the thirteen members were local rulers, all of whom who had binding contracts with the Dutch, which obliged them to swear loyalty to the Dutch sovereign and to abide by regulations drawn up by the Dutch. Aristocratic rulers governed 70 percent of the total area of East Indonesia, so the Senate as formed allowed these rulers to retain the powers they had had under Dutch role, while allowing the Dutch to exercise political control over the state. The body was officially inaugurated by the President of East Indonesia, Tjokorda Gde Raka Soekawati, on 28 May 1949.

No	Name	Constituency	Position	References
1	Iskandar Muhammad Jabir Shah	North Maluku	Sultan of Ternate (1929–1975)	
2	Lalu Wirentanus	Lombok	Regent of Central Lombok (1946–1959)	
3	Gusti Ngurah Kanta	Bali	Head of the Denpasar self-governing region (swapraja)	
4	Obe Alfonsus Nisnoni	Timor and surrounding islands	Raja of Kupang (1945–1955)	
5	Umbu Tunggu Mbili	Sumba	Raja of Memboro (1934–1962)	
6	Bapa Kaja	Flores	Chair of the Adonara Council of Rajas	
7	Lalu Mandjawakang	Sumbawa	Member of the Sumbawa Council of Rajas	
8	Achmad Marzoeki	South Sulawesi		
9	Johan Manusama	South Maluku	Headmaster of the Amboina Senior High School	
10	W.A. Sarapil	Sangihe and Talaud	Regent of Sangihe (1948–1950)	
11	Syukuran Aminuddin Amir	Central Sulawesi	Raja of Banggai (1939–1959)	
12	Peils Maurits Tangkilisan	Minahasa	Head of Amurang District	
13	H. J. C. Manoppo	North Sulawesi	Chairman of the Bolaang-Mongondouw Council of Rajas	

== Bibliography ==
- Bastiaans, W. Ch. J. (1950), Personalia Van Staatkundige Eenheden (Regering en Volksvertegenwoordiging) in Indonesie (per 1 Sept. 1949) (PDF), Jakarta
- Ide Anak Agung Gde Agung (1996) [1995]. From the Formation of the State of East Indonesia Towards the Establishment of the United States of Indonesia. Translated by Owens, Linda. Yayasan Obor. ISBN 979-461-216-2.
- Kahin, George McTurnan (1952). Nationalism and Revolution in Indonesia. Ithaca, New York: Cornell University Press.
- Ricklefs, M.C. (2001) [1981]. A History of Modern Indonesia Since c.1300 (3rd ed.). Palgrave. ISBN 978-0-230-54685-1.
- Schiller, A. Arthur (1955). The Formation of Federal Indonesia. W. van Hoeve Ltd.
- State of East Indonesia Information Ministry (nd). Pendidikan Politik Rakyat [Public Political Education] (PDF) (in Indonesian). Vol. 1. Makassar: State of East Indonesia Information Ministry.
