= Tjokorda Gde Raka Soekawati =

President of State of East Indonesia (1899–1967)

Tjokorda Gdé Raka Soekawati
- ᬘᭀᬓᭀᬃᬤᬕ᭄ᬤᬾᬭᬓᬲᬸᬓᬯᬢᬶ
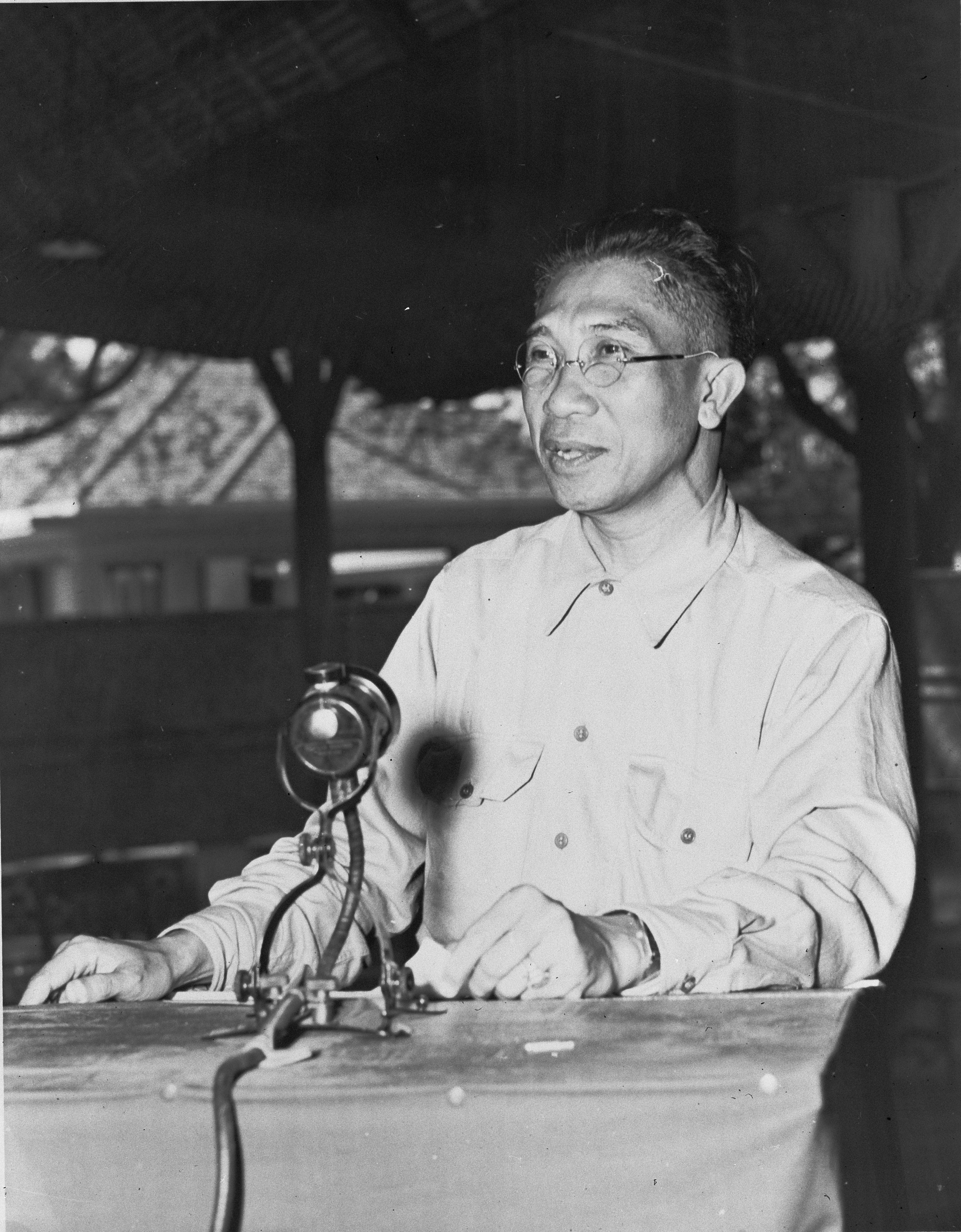
- Soekawati speech in 1946

1st President of the State of East Indonesia
- In office 24 December 1946 – 17 August 1950
- Prime Minister: Nadjamuddin Daeng Malewa; Semuel Jusof Warouw; Ide Anak Agung Gde Agung; J.E. Tatengkeng; D.P. Diapari; Martinus Putuhena
- Preceded by: Position created
- Succeeded by: Position abolished

Personal details
- Born: 15 January 1899 Ubud, Gianyar, Bali, Dutch East Indies (Netherlands)
- Died: 1967 (Aged 67 - 68) Indonesia
- Spouse(s): Gusti Agung Niang Putu; Gilberte Vincent
- Children: 3, including Tjokorda Ngurah Wim Sukawati

Tjokorda Gdé Raka Soekawati (EYD: Cokorda Gdé Raka Sukawati; Balinese: ᬘᭀᬓᭀᬃᬤᬕ᭄ᬤᬾᬭᬓᬲᬸᬓᬯᬢᬶ; 15 January 1899 – 1967) was a Balinese nobleman and politician who served as the first and only president of the State of East Indonesia from 1946 until its dissolution in 1950. His title, Tjokorda Gdé, signaled that Soekawati belonged to the highest ksatria (one of the four noble castes in Bali).

He had two wives, the first a Balinese, Gusti Agung Niang Putu, who gave him a son named Tjokorda Ngurah Wim Sukawati. In 1933, he married a French woman named Gilberte Vincent, who gave him two children.

His royal house is Sukawati.

== Biography ==
=== Early life and education ===
Tjokorda Gde Raka Soekawati was born on 15 January 1899 in Ubud on the island of Bali, then part of the Dutch East Indies and now part of the Gianyar district of the Indonesian province of Bali. Balinese by ethnicity, he belonged to the Balinese caste of ksatria, corresponding to the Indian kshatriyas, as indicated by the component "Tjokorda" in his name. From the beginning of the 19th century, the Sukawati family ruled Ubud, the principality of Gianyar; the latter, in turn, depended on the Dutch administration. Sukawati's father, Tjokorda Gede Sukawati, was the ruler of Ubud at the time of his son's birth.

In his youth, Soekawati attended a school for Indonesian officials. In 1918, as a candidate Indonesian civil servant, he was an official Indonesian candidate appointed by the Bandung auditors. At the end of the same year, he was mantri police (a title for native officials) to Denpasar. In 1919, now with political ambitions, was promoted to Punggawa (district) of his birthplace Ubud. In 1924 he was elected a member of the Volksraad consultative assembly, a position he held until 1927. Then, in the same year, he was a member of the board of delegates of the Volksraad. At the end of 1931 At the end of 1931, he abdicated in favor of his younger brother, Tjokorda Gde Agung Soekawati, and went to study in Europe. At the end of 1931, he left for Europe on a study assignment and first acted as head of the Balinese section of the Dutch exhibition at the International Colonial Exhibition in Paris. He then went to the Netherlands for his actual study assignment, which included the study of cooperative systems in agriculture and livestock breeding, about which he submitted a report on his return to the Indies in 1932. Until 1931 Sukawati remained a member of the board of delegates and until the Japanese invasion, he was a member of the Volksraad.

=== Political activities ===
After his return in 1932, he sat on various committees, such as the Agrarian Committee - where he, together with Logemann, dealt with the problem of Indonesian fundamental rights, among other things. Moreover, after his return from Europe, he was made available as a resident of Bali and Lombok. He was also charged with the administration of justice in Boeleleng-Bandoeng and Karangaseni. A year after the Japanese capitulation, he started his political career. In July 1946, he was a delegate at the Malino Conference. At this conference, he was also elected as a member of the advisory board for Borneo and East Indonesia. At the Denpasar Conference, he again chaired the General Committee. At the end of August 1946, he stayed in the Netherlands for a short time, together with the sultan of Pontianak, Syarif Hamid II, to provide information about the Malino Conference.

=== President of East Indonesia ===
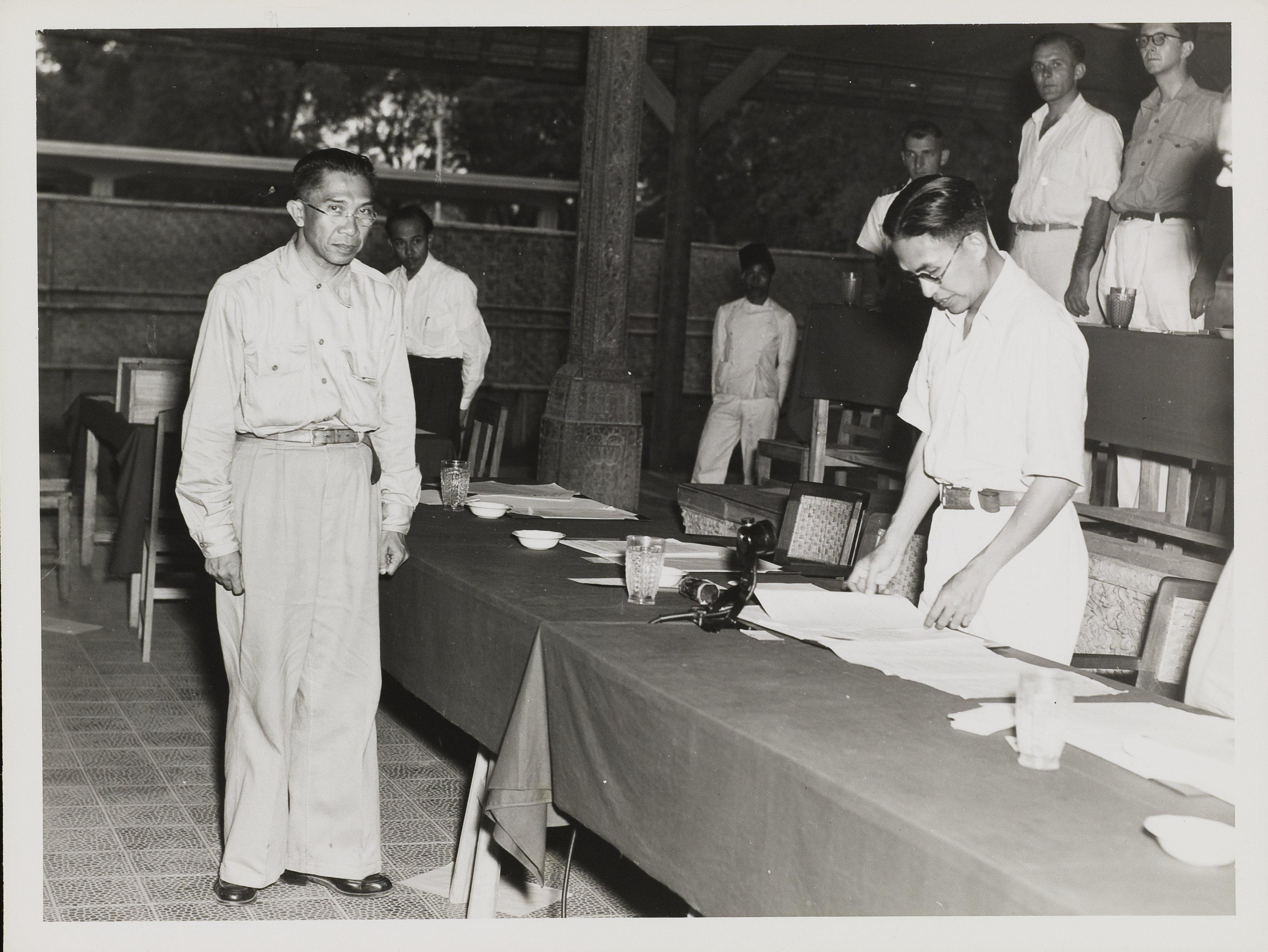
Tjokorda Gde Raka Soekawati (left) being sworn in as President of the State of East Indonesia at the Denpasar Conference

Between 18 and 24 December 1946, Soekawati attended the Denpasar Conference and was chosen as interim president of the State of the Great East, soon renamed the State of East Indonesia. The conference also led to the formation of the Provisional Parliament of East Indonesia. The "Republic of Indonesia" saw it as a puppet state of the Netherlands, at least until Prime Minister Anak Agung Gde Agung, through his so-called "Synthese-politics" (cooperation with the Republic), succeeded in securing the recognition of the Sukarno / Hatta government as a future "co-state" in the (federated) United States of Indonesia (Republik Indonesia Serikat, RIS). However, the mistrust remained. This is because the Dutch participated in the administration of East Indonesia, especially in the beginning, and the KNIL was prominent. The latter was necessary because, in certain places, such as in South Sulawesi, there was a lot of unrest, caused by 'pemudas' (youths). The first governments were characterized by fraud and corruption, but that changed under Prime Minister Agung. When the Netherlands transferred sovereignty to the RIS in 1949, the state ran into problems. The Republic sent troops to Sulawesi, against which former KNIL commander Andi Aziz led the Makassar Uprising. Sukawati was probably part of the plot, but that has never been proven. Thought was given to the declaration of an independent state of East Indonesia, but that initiative failed because the Netherlands did not want to cooperate. The uprising ended, parliament dismissed the government and dissolved the state. The new East Indonesian Cabinet was pro-Republican and advocated the integration of East Indonesia into the unitary Indonesian Republic. On 21 April 1950, he successfully negotiated East Indonesia's integration into the unitary Republic of Indonesia, believing there was majority support for a unitary state. Sukawati had no choice but to merge into the unitary state of Indonesia and therefore voted positively when Sukarno proclaimed Indonesia a unitary state on 17 August 1950. Sukawati played an important role in the process of the integration of the State of East Indonesia into the Republic of Indonesia.

== Personal life ==
Soekawati had a Balinese wife, Gusti Agung Niang Putu, of which a son was born Tjokorda Ngurah Wim Sukawati. In 1933 Tjokorda Raka married a French woman named Gilberte Vincent with whom he had two sons.
