= Tjokorda Ngurah Wim Sukawati =

- ᬢ᭄ᬚᭀᬓᭀᬃᬤᬗᬸᬭᬄᬯᬶᬫ᭄ᬲᬸᬓᬯᬢᬶ

Personal details
- Born: 1 February 1923; Ubud, Gianyar, Bali, Dutch East Indies
- Died: 24 February 2013 (aged 90); Jakarta, Indonesia
- Spouse: Nelly Sukawati - Luchsinger
- Parents: Tjokorda Gde Raka Soekawati (father); Gusti Agung Niang Putu (mother)
- Relatives: Tjokorda Oka Artha Ardana Sukawati (cousin)

Tjokorda Ngurah Wim Sukawati, (Balinese: ᬢ᭄ᬚᭀᬓᭀᬃᬤᬗᬸᬭᬄᬯᬶᬫ᭄ᬲᬸᬓᬯᬢᬶ; 1 February 1923 – 24 February 2013) was the eldest son of the President of the State of East Indonesia and former King of Ubud Tjokorda Gde Raka Soekawati and his wife Gusti Agung Niang Putu. His title Tjokorda Gde indicates that Sukawati belonged to the highest ksatria (one of the four noble castes in Bali).

His royal house is Sukawati.

== Education ==
Traditionally the eldest son becomes the head of the Puri Ubud royal family, but like his father, he took a more active role in the Indonesian government. Tjokorda Wim started his education in Bali and also attended Primary School in Menteng, Jakarta.

Tjokorda Wim also attended primary school in Oosterbeek, The Netherlands, when his father was heading a cultural mission in Europe (expo di Paris) in 1931. The cultural mission included a legong group from Peliatan and agriculture groups from Bali. At that time his father took three of his children to Europe, Tjokorda Wim Anak Agung Vera and Anak Agung Oka Willy.

Tjokorda Wim followed junior high school (SMP) in Malang and senior high school (SMA) in Yogyakarta. He went on to Sukabumi, West Java, and graduated from the police academy, which became the start of his career.

From 1942 until 1947 Tjokorda Wim was a police inspector in Gianyar, Bali until his promotion to police commissioner in the capital of the Republic of East Indonesia, Makassar. After serving in Stockholm and Paris Tjokorda Wim became the Indonesian Ambassador to Switzerland from 1975 to 1979.

== Family ==
It was in Makassar, that he met the Dutch woman, Nelly Luchsinger, who became his partner for life for 64 years. Nelly worked as a teacher at the OSVO in Makassar teaching cooking and nutrition. Together they had two children.

== Royal Cremation Ceremony ==
Tjokorda Ngurah Wim Sukawati died at the age of 90 on 24 February 2013, in a hospital in Jakarta due to illnesses associated with old age. He was cremated in a Balinese royal cremation in Ubud. It included a nine-tiered, 22-meter-tall bade (cremation tower), a five-meter-long naga banda (dragon), and a five-meter-tall lembu (black bull)sarcophagus. It was the biggest cremation held in Bali that year with thousands attending.
