= Malino Conference =

Dutch conference about the independence of Indonesia

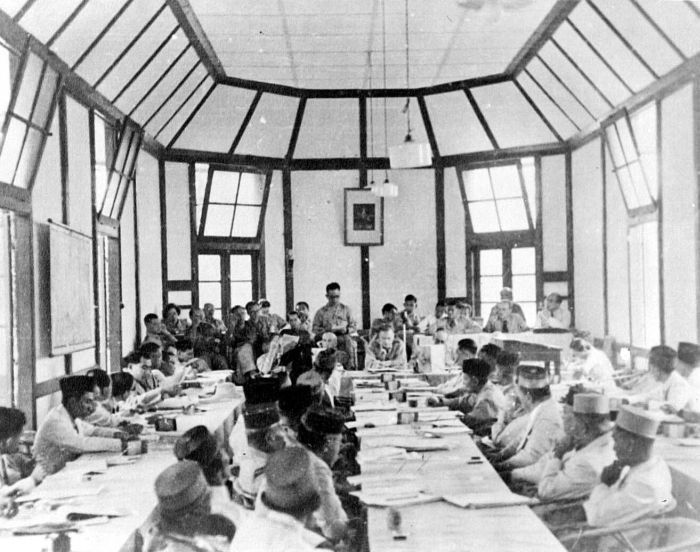

The Malino Conference was organised by the Dutch in the Sulawesi town of Malino from 16 to 25 July 1946 as part of their attempt to arrange a federal solution for Indonesia. From the end of World War II, Indonesian Republicans had been trying to secure Indonesian Independence from the Dutch colonial control.

The Dutch summoned 39 Indonesians who represented the (rajas), Christians, and other ethnic groups from Kalimantan and East Indonesia and who were in favor of maintaining some sort of link with the Netherlands. The extent of Indonesian support for true autonomy, however, was not something the Dutch had anticipated. Plans for two states—one for East Indonesia and one for Kalimantan—came out of the summit.

== Background ==
Following the 17 August 1945 declaration of independence, the Indonesian War of Independence broke out between the Indonesians and the Dutch, who were tying to regain control over their colony. Following the surrender of Japan and the end of the Japanese occupation of the Dutch East Indies, the eastern part of the country was occupied by Australian forces, accompanied by Netherlands Indies Civil Administration (NICA) officials, who the Australians allowed to take over governance. This was in sharp contrast to the policy of the British forces occupying Java and Sumatra, who prevented the Dutch from interfering in administrative concerns. By early 1946, Acting Governor-General of the Dutch East Indies Hubertus van Mook had come to the conclusion that it was no longer possible to return to the pre-war status quo, and began to work towards the establishment of an Indonesian commonwealth linked to the Dutch crown. His proposal for such a commonwealth was approved by Dutch Colonial Affairs Minister Johann Logemann, and announced on 10 February. Negotiations in March between van Mook and Indonesia Prime Minister Sutan Sjahrir led to recognition of de facto republican control over Java, Madura and Sumatra, and Dutch sovereignty over the rest of Indonesia. When this became known, Sjahrir was briefly arrested by the Indonesian army. Meanwhile, van Mook began cultivating links with Indonesian leaders outside east Java, particularly in west Java and eastern Indonesia, and subsequently decided to move ahead with attempts to establish a federal Indonesia by holding a conference in Malino.

== Conference delegates ==
Van Mook began making approaches to prospective delegates in April 1946, asking them to attend and participate in a conference to discuss the structure of a government in eastern Indonesia. In those regions such as Bali and South Sulawesi there were representative bodies in place, and these assemblies appointed delegates. In other areas, NICA officials and local leaders nominated representatives. There were a total of 53 delegates and advisers from across eastern Indonesia, including Borneo and West Papua, as well as from Bangka/Belitung. Indonesian vice-president Mohammad Hatta claimed that these delegates were gathered "at the point of a bayonet", although the delegated subsequently denied this. There was also a large Dutch delegation headed by van Mook.

== The negotiations ==
The official opening ceremony was held on 16 July, with van Mook making a long speech in which he stated that "the Netherlands Government... considers it imperative that, in the quickest possible way and according to carefully thought out plans, these countries [within the Indonesian federation] will be put in a position to govern themselves." Delegates agreed that colonialism must not return to Indonesia, that there must be continued links between Indonesia and the Netherlands and that Indonesia should be united in the form of a federal United States of Indonesia. This would comprise four "autonomous territories", Java, Sumatra, the Great East (including West Papua) and Netherlands Borneo. It was also resolved to hold a further conference to determine the form of governance for Borneo and the Great East and that Borneo and the Great East should be represented in negotiations between the Republic of Indonesia and the Dutch. A committee of seven would be established to negotiate the future form of the government with the Dutch General Government Commission

== Aftermath ==
Three months after the conference, delegates from minority groups met at a conference in Pangkal Pinang, Bangka at which they expressed support for the views expressed at Malino. Members of the General Government Commission subsequently met regional leaders and the Commission of Seven Indonesian representatives, who played only an advisory role. Because of the ongoing political instability in Borneo, it was decided to focus the endeavor to establish a federal state on the Great East region. Van Mook subsequently decided to hold the Denpasar Conference in December 1946 to discuss the establishment of a government in this region. Meanwhile, in November, the Dutch reached their first agreement with the republican side, and recognized republican authority over Java, Madura and Sumatra.

In May 1948, a Second Malino Conference was held. It was attended by representatives of the self-governing areas in the State of East Indonesia, who proposed a law establishing a Provisional Senate. This proposal was turned into a law the following year.
