= Denpasar Conference =

1946 conference

- Part of the Decolonization of Asia
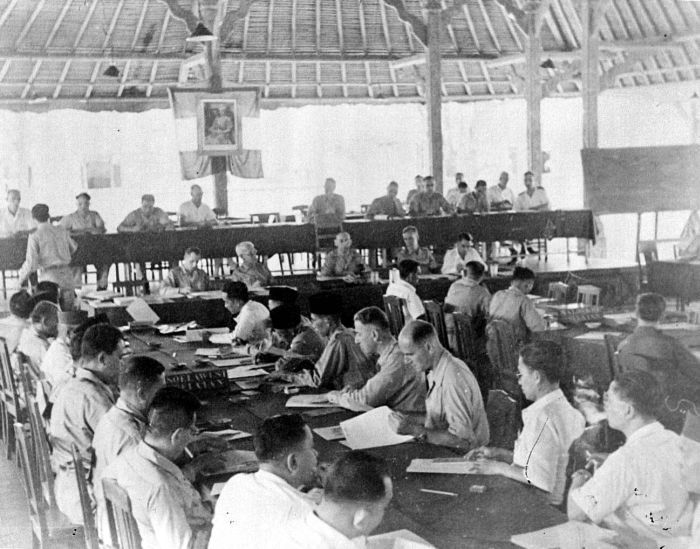
- The Denpasar Conference in session
- Date: 7–24 December 1946
- Location: Hotel Bali, Denpasar, Great East Governorate
- Cause: Previous agreements made in the Malino Conference
- Outcome: Independence of East Indonesia

The Denpasar Conference was held from 7–24 December 1946 at the Hotel Bali, Denpasar and resulted in the establishment of the State of East Indonesia, part of the United States of Indonesia.

It was at this conference that the Dutch government stated its position that control of Western New Guinea would not be handed over at the same time as the rest of the Dutch East Indies.

== Background ==
The Malino Conference, organized by Acting Governor-General of the Dutch East Indies Hubertus van Mook and held from 16–25 July 1946, resulted in an agreement among the delegates from eastern Indonesia, as well as Bangka and Belitung to work together to establish a federal United States of Indonesia which would comprise three constituent states: the Republic of Indonesia (Java and Sumatra), the State of Borneo, and the 'Great Eastern State' (the Great East or Groote Oost - which would include Western New Guinea). Due to ongoing instability in Borneo, as well as open conflict with the Republican forces in Java and Sumatra, van Mook decided to focus on the Great East, and to organize a conference in order to establish a state in this region. Before it was held, the Dutch concluded the Linggadjati Agreement with the Republicans. In this agreement, the Dutch recognized Republican sovereignty over Java, Sumatra and Madura, and both sides agreed to work together to establish the United States of Indonesia and its three component states. However, at the time of the Denpasar Conference, the Linggadjati Agreement had only been initialed by both sides, not formally signed, allowing the Dutch to claim that it was not yet valid. On 10 December 1946, the Dutch government announced its own interpretation of the Agreement in a statement from Foreign Minister Jan Jonkman. This stated that Western New Guinea would not after all be handed over to the United States of Indonesia, a statement at odds with Article 3 of the Linggadjati Agreement. This was the result of pressure from the Dutch Catholic Party, which wished to continue the missionary activities in the region, although van Mook claimed that financial and ethnic issues were the reason. Due to the fact that the request for any Papuan representatives in the conference was rejected by the Dutch authorities, on 12 December 1946, Nicolaas Jouwe, Marthen Indey, and Corinus Krey sent a telegram to van Mook in Denpasar to oppose the formation of the State of East Indonesia as it did not include Western New Guinea.

== Delegates ==
The Great East was divided into thirteen regions, with each region selecting a number of delegates in proportion to its population. Van Mook set a limit of 55 regional delegates, with an additional fifteen representing minority ethnic groups, making a total of 70. Although the Dutch claimed that the regional delegates were elected, they were in fact selected by Dutch-appointed officials, and the majority of them were either colonial officials or regional aristocrats.

The composition was as follows:

Region	Delegates
South Sulawesi	16
Minahasa	3
North Sulawesi	2
Central Sulawesi (Donggala)	2
Central Sulawesi (Poso)	2
Sangihe & Talaud	2
North Moluccas	2
South Moluccas	3
Bali	7
Lombok	5
Timor	3
Flores	3
Sumbawa	3
Sumba	2
Ethnic minorities	15
Total	70

== Conference proceedings ==
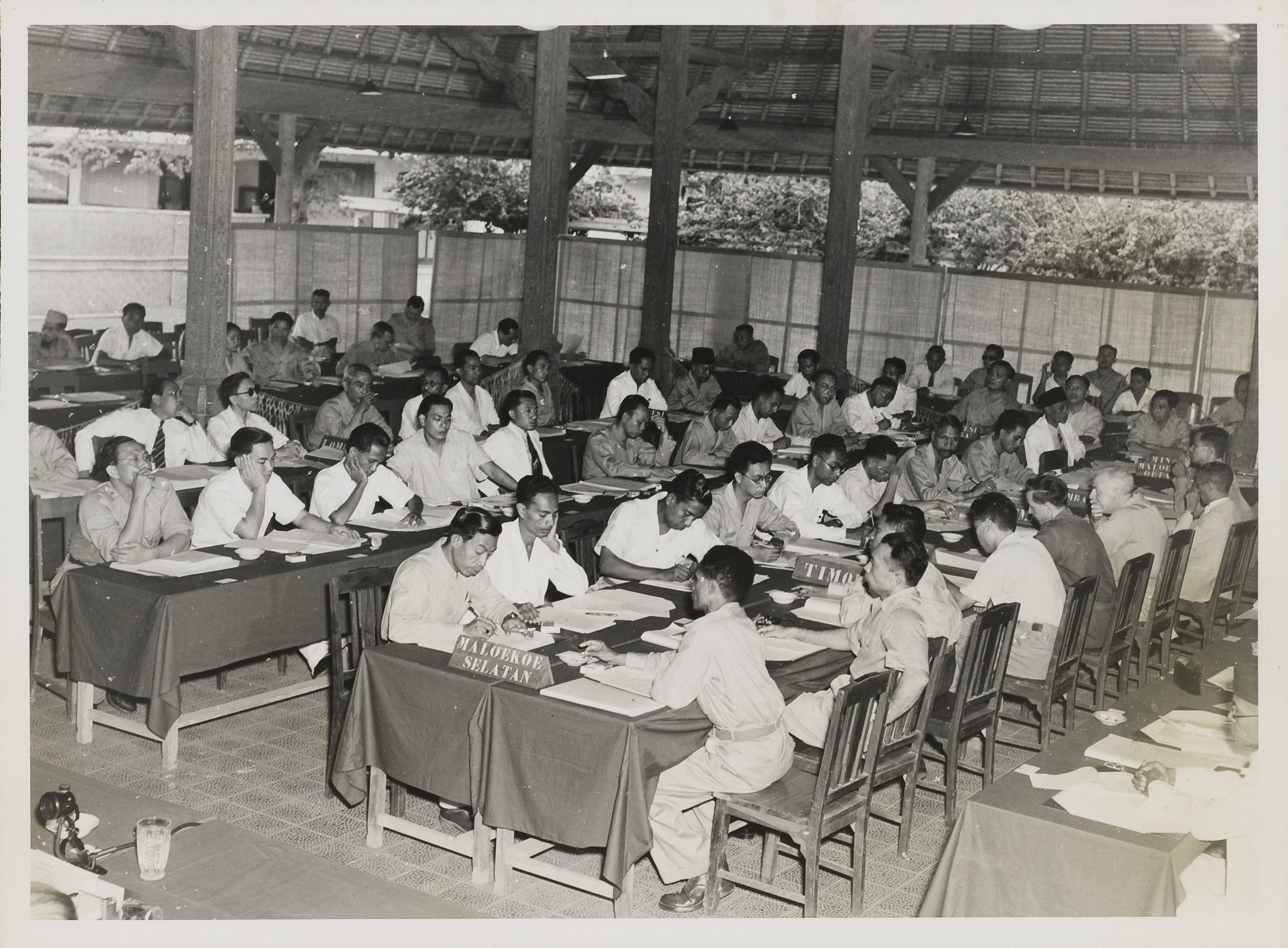
Participants of the Denpasar Conference

The conference was due to be opened on 7 December by van Mook, but he was delayed by the complications associated with the Dutch interpretation of the Linggadjati Agreement. In his absence, General Government Commissioner van Hoven chaired the opening session and presented a draft legal basis for an independent State of the Great East. Discussions on this paper continued until van Mook's arrival on 17 December. It included the following provisions:

- the State of Indonesia would comprise the Great East except Western New Guinea;
- matters relating to foreign policy, defense and the supreme court, among a total of 40 areas others, would remain the responsibility of the central government;
- a Crown Commissioner would be appointed, with wide-ranging powers including ensuring the protection of the rights of ethnic and religions minorities as well as regional rulers;
- the state would be divided into 13 autonomous regions;
- the head of state would appoint ministers, who would be responsible to a Parliament.

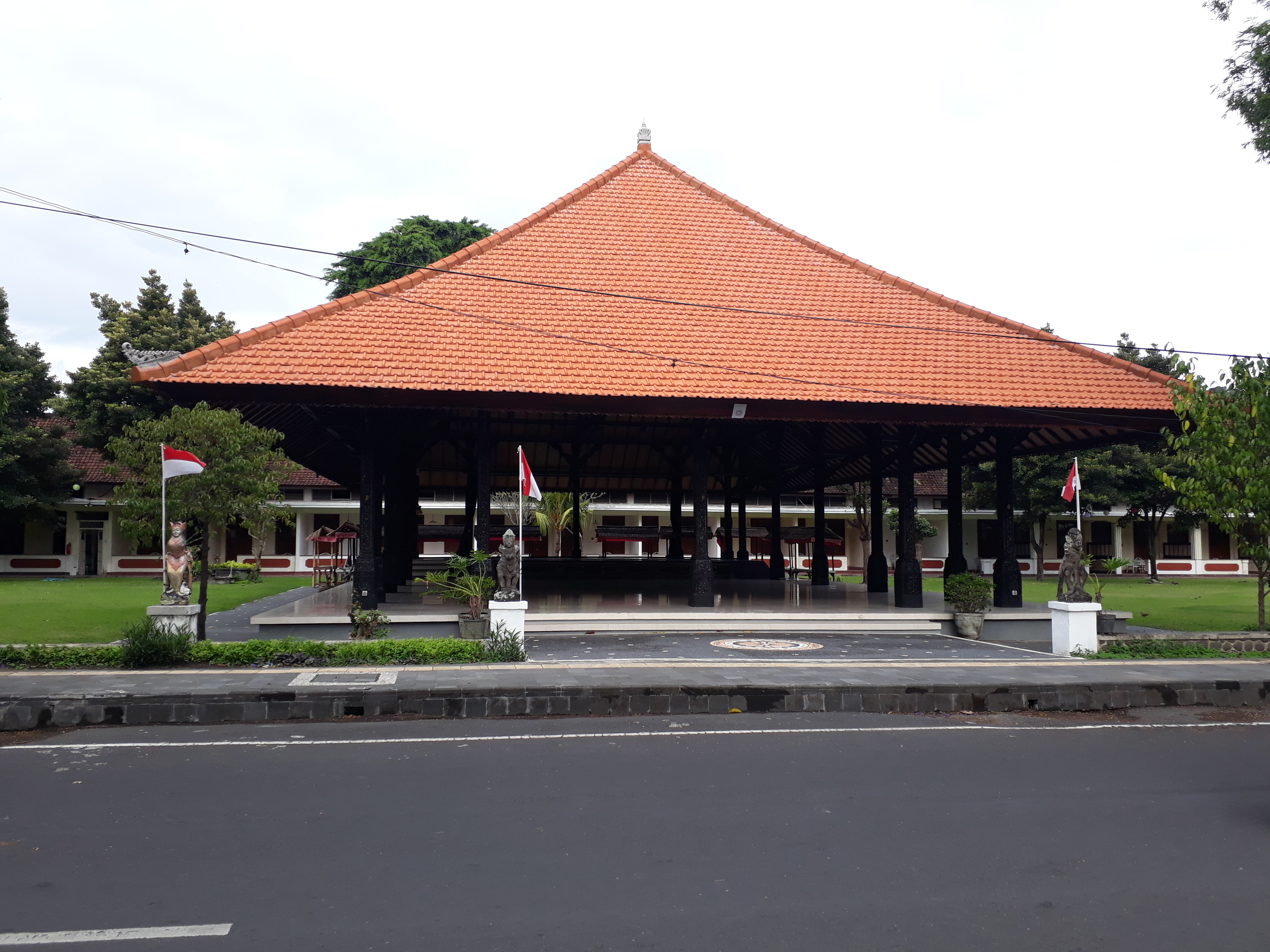
The restored Hotel Bali meeting hall, or pendopo, in Denpasar where the conference was held

On 9 December, conference delegates expressed support for the Linggadjati Agreement as a basis for the establishment of the United States of Indonesia, and called for it to be ratified immediately in cables sent to the Central Indonesian National Committee in Yogyakarta and to the Dutch parliament. On 18 December, following his arrival, van Mook officially opened the conference and an agenda was agreed on. Subsequently it emerged that the majority of delegates disagreed with the Dutch refusal to delegate complete authority to the new state, as this would mean that East Indonesia would not have equal status with the Republic of Indonesia, to which full authority had been delegated under the Linggadjati Agreement. There was also strenuous opposition to the non-inclusion of Western New Guinea. As more than 75% of the new nation would be autonomous regions headed by local rulers, delegates proposed the establishment of an upper house or a senate to represent regional interests. Finally, a majority called for the national anthem to be Indonesia Raya, and for the Indonesian red and white flag to be the national flag of East Indonesia.

On 22 December, van Mook gave his response to the proposals. He supported the establishment of the senate and the use of the Indonesian national anthem, but was more cautious about the flag. He expressed a wish for Western New Guinea to be an autonomous region with a special relationship with the United States of Indonesia.

In later discussions, van Mook refused to compromise on the status of Western New Guinea as the 10 December statement by Dutch Foreign Minister Jonkman had given him no room for maneuver. It was decided that the status of the territory would be decided later. On 23 December, the draft for the Regulations on Forming the State of Indonesia were drawn up, and approved the following day. This supplemented the existing Dutch colonial law dating from 1927, and would become the provisional constitution. Balinese noble Tjokorda Gde Raka Soekawati was elected head of state and Tadjoeddin Noor was elected chair of the Provisional Parliament, and subsequently took over the chairmanship of the conference. The conference delegates became the Provisional Parliament, and it was decided it would meet in Makassar, the capital, on 1 March 1947. Soon after, Soekawati was named first President of the State of East Indonesia and designated Nadjamoeddin Daeng Malewa as Prime Minister.

== Aftermath ==
After the conference ended, President Soekawati and Prime Minister Designate Nadjamoeddin traveled to Jakarta to hold meetings to establish the first cabinet, which was announced on 13 January 1947. It was inaugurated the same day in the presence of Dutch officials, including van Mook. Their presence, as well as the fact the ceremony took place in Jakarta rather than Makassar promoted criticism of Nadjamoeddin for the continuing influence of the Dutch in the affairs of the new nation. This criticism intensified when the provisional legislature held its first session in Makassar, at which many Dutch-appointed delegates expressed support for the Indonesian Republic rather than the Dutch plans for the federal state. The regional rulers also became concerned at losing the power and privileges they had enjoyed under the Dutch, and pushed for the establishment of a senate with one member for each of the 13 regions, which would have a veto over the final constitution. Due to their control of the majority of these regions, the rulers had a guaranteed majority on the new body, which was established on 28 May 1949. However the constitution was never ratified before the State of East Indonesia was dissolved into the unitary Republic of Indonesia on 17 August 1950. Exclusion of Western New Guinea from the State of East Indonesia would lead to the creation of Partai Irian Dalam Republik Indonesia Serikat (PIDRIS). Marthen Indey (as deputy leader of the party) managed to travel to Ambon on 7 January 1947 to meet with pro-Indonesian Moluccan figures, but he was caught by Dutch authorities on 23 March 1947 and later transferred to Hollandia from Biak and sentenced to 4 years in prison. Meanwhile, the party's founders, Corinus Krey and Petrus Wettebossy, were caught by Dutch authorities in Biak.
