= Great East =

Governorate of the Dutch East Indies (1938–1946)

Governorate of the Great East Gouvernement Groote Oost (Dutch)
- Governorate of the Dutch East Indies
- 1938–1946
- Flag Emblem (Note: The emblem of the Headquarters consisted of a light-blue disc, surrounded by the Dutch red-white and blue and charged with the yellow cypher GOBH (Grote Oost en Borneo Hoofdkwartier / Great East and Borneo Headquarters). - Clg. 283/GS/35)

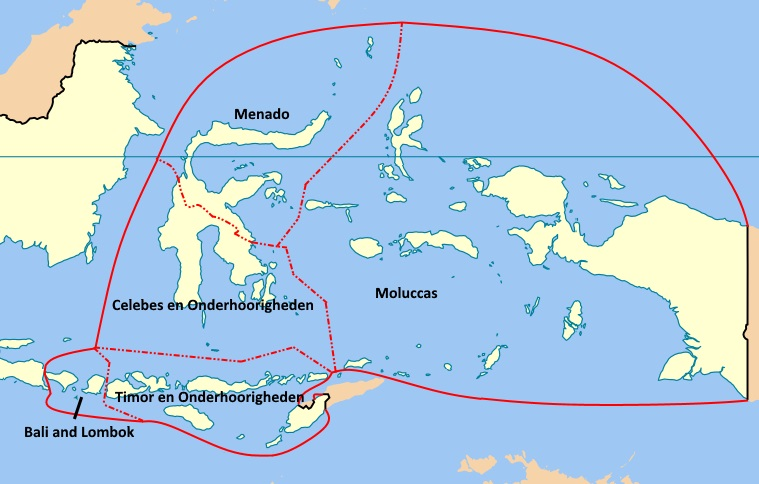
- The Great East region of the Dutch East Indies
- Capital: Makassar
- Government
- Monarch
  - 1938–1946: Wilhelmina
- History
  - Merger of the Constituent Entities: 25 May 1938
  - Japanese occupation: 1942–1945
  - Became the State of the Great East: 24 December 1946
Preceded by	Succeeded by
Dutch East Indies	Japanese occupation of the Dutch East Indies; State of East Indonesia
- Today part of: Indonesia

The Great East (Dutch: Groote Oost) was a governorate (gouvernement) of the Dutch East Indies between 1938 and 1946. It comprised all the islands to the east of Borneo (Celebes, the Moluccas, and West New Guinea, with their offshore islands) and of Java (Bali and the Lesser Sunda Islands). Its capital was Macassar on Celebes.

The Great East was created with the merger of its constituent residencies on 25 May 1938 and was ruled by a governor. The first governor was G. A. W. Ch. de Haze Winkelman. Following World War II, the governorate (except for Netherlands New Guinea) became the State of the Great East (later the State of East Indonesia) on 24 December 1946. This state became a constituent of the federal United States of Indonesia in 1949 and was integrated into a unitary Indonesia in 1950 (except West New Guinea, which was only integrated in 1963). As of December 2022, the area is divided into the eastern 17 of Indonesia's 38 provinces.

== Administrative divisions ==
The Great East gouvernement consisted of the following residencies:

- Bali en Lombok (Singaradja)
- Celebes en Onderhoorigheden (Macassar), including southern Celebes and neighbouring islands
- Menado (Menado), including all of northern Celebes
- Moluccas (Amboina), including the Moluccas, West New Guinea, and other outlying islands such as Wetar and Aru
- Timor en Onderhoorigheden (Kupang), including western Timor and the other Lesser Sunda Islands (except for Bali and Lombok)

== See also ==
- State of East Indonesia
